= 2017 in Singapore =

- Decades: 1990s; 2000s; 2010s; 2020s
- See also: Other events of 2017; Timeline of Singaporean history

The following lists events that happened during 2017 in the Republic of Singapore.

== Incumbents ==
- President: Tony Tan Keng Yam (until 31 August), J. Y. Pillay (Acting) (1 to 14 September), Halimah Yacob (starting 14 September)
- Prime Minister: Lee Hsien Loong

== Events ==
=== January ===
- 1 January –
  - The collection of iris images starts as amendments to the National Registration Act come into force. Some SingPost employees are appointed for that role.
  - The re-registration of NRICs starts for those aged 55 and above. Those turning 55 on or after 1 January 2017 are required to re-register for a new NRIC if they had not replaced their NRIC within the past 10 years.
  - The sale of 2G phones for use in Singapore are no longer allowed, with sales for export and overseas use still allowed.
- 4 January – Raffles Country Club will be acquired for the Singapore Rail Test Centre and Cross Island MRT line Western Depot, making it the second country club affected.
- 5 January – Maxwell Chambers will be expanded to meet demand for dispute resolution services, taking over the Red Dot Design Museum, which moved to Marina Bay in end-2017. The expanded section is now called Maxwell Chambers Suites. Due to strong demand, a second annexe block of 3,500 sq ft space is also constructed on top of the original 120,000 sq ft.
- 9 January – The re-employment age is raised to the age of 67 on 1 July, from 65 currently among changes to the Retirement and Re-employment Act passed. In addition, eligible employees can be re-employed by another firm, and an option to cut 10 percent of wages at age 60 is removed.
- 10 January – The Active Mobility Act is passed to regulate personal mobility devices and bicycles, and sets out penalties for non-compliance.
- 18 January –
  - A NEWater plant is launched in Changi, built on top of an existing one.
  - The Ministry of Health announced that the current six healthcare clusters will be merged into three, namely the National Healthcare Group, SingHealth and National University Health System. In addition, the National University Health System will form the National University Polyclinics.
- 20 January - The sleeper replacement project on the North–South and East–West lines are completed, resulting in longer lasting concrete sleepers.
- 21 January – The launch of homegrown bike sharing firm oBike. Since then, Ofo, Mobike, SG Bike, GBikes and other providers have launched in the following months, leading to the scrapping of the proposed national bike sharing scheme.
- 24 January - The Ministry of Foreign Affairs announced that all nine Terrexes will return to Singapore after being detained in Hong Kong. The vehicles arrived back on 30 January.

=== February ===
- 6 February – Laws are passed to ban short-term renting services such as Airbnb.
- 9 February – The Committee of Future Economy releases its report, highlighting seven strategies to transform Singapore's economy.
- 17 February – The name Syonan-to is dropped from the Old Ford Factory exhibition after a controversy.
- 18 February –
  - Tuas Viaduct is opened to traffic, making it Singapore's first road-rail viaduct.
  - Hougang woman Low Soh Kim wins $162,550 in the MediaCorp Channel 8's long-running game show The Sheng Siong Show, surpassing Ang Siang Kiat's winnings of $135,150 as the biggest winner in the show's history until on 12 January 2019, where Chen Si Jie's winnings of $193,400 surpasses Low's total.
- 20 February –
  - A new SMEs Go Digital Programme is announced to enable SMEs to digitalise with Industry Digital Plans, in addition to new SME Technology Hub to be set up. A new Tech Access Initiative is announced too.
  - The Government announced a water price hike of 30% in two phases, fully taking effect on 1 July 2018. A 10 per cent water conservation tax on NEWater will be levied on businesses, with the sanitary appliance and waterborne fees combined into a single volume-based fee.
  - A carbon tax is proposed at an initial rate of $10 to $20 per tonne of emissions, which will be implemented by 2019. Diesel taxes are restructured to a $0.10 volume duty per litre to reduce consumption. The Carbon Emissions-based Vehicle Scheme (CEVS) will be replaced with the Vehicular Emissions Scheme (VES), measuring four more pollutants other than carbon dioxide. The Early Turnover Scheme will be extended by two years. Motorcycles will be taxed with a three-tier Additional Registration Fee.
- 24 February – Hillion Mall opens its doors to the public.
- 27 February – Junction Tree debuts as the first bilingual preschool TV programme.
- 28 February –
  - MINDEF is hit by a cyberattack which resulted in 850 personnel being affected.
  - The Early Childhood Development Centres Act is passed, setting higher and more consistent standards in running childcare centres and kindergartens. Among them include a common licensing system lasting for three years each, more investigative powers, higher penalties matching the severity of offences and requiring approval by the Early Childhood Development Agency before working at such centres.

=== March ===
- 3 March – MINDEF announced plans to create a Defence Cyber Organisation to beef up against future cyberattacks. In addition, SAFTI City will be built for urban training.
- 7 March –
  - The Ministry of Education announced that academic tests will no longer be allowed under Direct School Admission changes to focus on students' other strengths. Other measures include reserving 20% of non-affiliated students in schools from 2019 and allowing students to take subjects at a higher level in all schools from 2018. A new ITE technical diploma will be launched soon, along with SkillsFuture work-study degree programmes in several universities. The Early Admissions Exercise (EAE) will be introduced for ITE admissions (making up 15 percent), along with an increase in EAE intake to polytechnics to 15 percent.
  - The Ministry of National Development announced that JTC Corporation will be appointed the master developer of Punggol North, Singapore's first "enterprise district" housing digital and cybersecurity industries and connected to the future Singapore Institute of Technology campus. JTC will be allowed to vary land use instead of using zoning rules. A master developer will be appointed when Kampong Bugis, a residential district, is developed.
- 9 March – The Ministry of Health announced a new 5-year Community Mental Health masterplan to improve mental health care, with help from agencies as well as services in polyclinics. Palliative care will also be strengthened too.
- 13 March - The Infocomm Media Development Authority awards FM89.3 and FM96.3 to Singapore Press Holdings (SPH). The radio stations will have financial content and another in Chinese catering to seniors. The stations will be launched this year.
- 17 March – SIM University comes under the Ministry of Education, renamed as the Singapore University of Social Sciences. It is awarded autonomous university status on 11 July 2017, making it the sixth autonomous university in Singapore.
- 21 March – Construction starts on Tan Tock Seng Hospital's new Integrated Care Hub. The 500-bed complex will rehabilitate patients, which will be completed by 2022. In addition, a hospice care provider will move there.
- 29 March – The Urban Redevelopment Authority unveiled plans to rejuvenate the Kallang River area. These include more cycling paths and developments along the riverside.
- 30 March – The Immigration and Checkpoints Authority announced an upcoming expansion of Woodlands Checkpoint to cope with future traffic growth.
- 31 March –
  - Samudera LRT station is opened.
  - The Botanic Gardens' new Learning Forest opens.

=== April ===
- 1 April –
  - The 2G network ceases with the shutdown completed on 18 April.
  - The Singapore Art Museum will undergo enhancement works, which will finish in 2021.
- 2 April –
  - Strollers are now allowed on buses in a bid to be family-friendly.
  - A new vehicle underpass linking the Kallang–Paya Lebar Expressway and Nicoll Highway opens to traffic.
- 7 April – City Harvest Church Criminal Breach of Trust Case: An appeal regarding the conviction last year concluded; the sentences of the six accused church pastors of City Harvest Church were shortened, this happened as the crimes were convicted under a less serious form of criminal breach of trust as compared to the 1976 judgement. All the convicted pastors (with the exception of Chew Eng Han who was on bail; Chew later served his sentence on 22 February 2018) began their jail sentences on 21 April.
- 9 April – United Overseas Bank and OCBC Bank announced that fees for their shared ATMs will be waived until the end of 2017 to raise awareness of the scheme, in place since 1988.
- 10 April – The Ministry of Culture, Community and Youth announced that The Esplanade will be building a new mid-size waterfront theatre. Costing $30 million, the venue can seat 550 people and will be completed by 2021.
- 16 April –
  - The Ministry of National Development unveils Remaking our Heartland plans for Woodlands, with the vision "Star of the North". It will have new residential blocks in the north, as well as six new attractions including business parks, recreational facilities, a new hospital park and new linkways.
  - Full day Sunday trials of the new signalling system on the North–South Line begin. At the same time, the new C151B train debuts.
- 18 April – Woodlands Health Campus begins construction works, which will be ready by 2022.
- 20 April –
  - The first four sets of junior colleges will be merged from 2019.
  - Lazada launched the LiveUp programme in preparation for Amazon's impending launch in Singapore.
- 22 April –
  - The Ministry of National Development unveils Remaking our Heartland plans for Toa Payoh, with the vision "Our Charming Toa Payoh". Two new housing areas will be built, along with more dragon replicas, two new parks, initiatives for the arts and heritage, and amenities for the elderly.
  - The 10 km Tanah Merah Coast Road extension, which has on-road cycling lanes, opens to traffic. The extension replaces the Changi Coast Road, closing for airport expansion works.
- 27 April - The one-way Sentosa Gateway Tunnel is opened to traffic after a two-year delay. The tunnel can only support cars due to a height constraint of 3.5 metres.
- 29 April –
  - The Ministry of National Development unveils Remaking our Heartland plans for Pasir Ris, with the vision "Our Urban Sanctuary". Among them include a new mixed-use development with a bus interchange, several new linkways including a 1.2 km Central Greenway, new flats near the sea, and improved neighbourhood facilities.
  - Elections for the Football Association of Singapore (FAS) leadership were held, with Lim Kia Tong and Bill Ng as contenders. Lim Kia Tong's team wins in a landslide. Meanwhile, the police had raided the FAS and Bill Ng's football clubs over alleged misuse of funds.

=== May ===
- 1 May – The Smart Nation and Digital Government Office (SNDGO) is formed to speed up digital initiatives with expertise from Ministry of Finance, Ministry of Communications and Information and Smart Nation Programme Office. GovTech is now under the Prime Minister's Office, together forming the Smart Nation and Digital Government Group (SNDGG).
- 3 May – Fox+ is launched by Fox as a streaming service.
- 4 May – A fire breaks out in a building at Toh Guan, causing one death. Subsequent investigations by the Singapore Civil Defence Force found that the building's cladding is flammable and 39 buildings used similar cladding. As a result, 3 cladding brands are found to be unsafe.
- 8 May – A debate on milk prices ensued in Parliament after The Straits Times reported in March that milk prices more than doubled over the past decade. Two days later, the Competition Commission of Singapore found that brand loyalty and demand for premium brands drove milk power prices up. In response, the Agri-Food and Veterinary Authority of Singapore announced new advertising guidelines that disallows nutrition and health claims, coupled with attractive images, and encourage breastfeeding. In addition, various supermarket chains have introduced affordable milk brands, which are Einmilk (a made-in-Singapore milk brand), Australia's Own, Nature One, FairPrice Gold, and Blackmores.
- 12 May – National University of Singapore (NUS) and Nanyang Technological University (NTU) suffered a cyberattack on their servers.
- 16 May – A fire broke out at Changi Airport T2, causing 40 flights to be delayed and shutting operations for more than four hours.
- 24 May – Three special education schools for those with autism will expand.
- 27 May – An Apple Store opens in Orchard Road, a first in Singapore.
- 28 May – Bencoolen Street is relaunched as a car-lite road. Personal Mobility Devices and foldable bikes are now allowed on public transport from 1 June, after a six-month trial. A cycling network in the city is also planned too.
- 29 May – Full day weekday trials of the new signalling system begin on the North–South Line.

=== June ===
- 1 June
  - A Traffic Police officer, SSGT Nadzrie Bin Matin, succumbs to his injuries after colliding with a black van while performing his traffic patrol duties.
  - Junction Nine shopping centre and Nine Residences in Yishun are officially opened to the Northern residences, followed by Wisteria Mall on 28 July the following year.
- 2 June –
  - Singapore records its largest count of retrenchments in the first quarter in 14 years according to Citi Research.
  - Construction starts on the new National Cancer Centre Singapore building, which will better serve cancer patients. The building will be ready by 2022.
- 7 June – Punggol Coast MRT station is announced to serve the future Punggol Creative Cluster, which has been brought forward from 2030 to 2023.
- 11 June - The Braddell Flyover opens to traffic after three delays.
- 12 June –
  - An infant-care assistant became the first Singaporean woman to be detained under the Internal Security Act for radicalism.
  - The Ministry of Health announced that 72 packs of incompletely sterilised dental instruments were used at the National Dental Centre.
- 13 June – Sentosa will have refreshed attractions around Merlion Gateway, with new attractions as well as an elevated walkway by 2021.
- 14 June – Several allegations are made public on Facebook over the fate of 38 Oxley Road.
- 18 June – The Tuas West Extension of the East–West MRT line opens.
- 27 June –
  - The Monetary Authority of Singapore will now allow banks to operate or acquire stakes in digital platforms and sell consumer goods and services online. Requirements will also be streamlined for acquisition of complementary non-financial services. However, banks will still not be allowed to venture into property and resort businesses.
  - At the same time, PayNow is unveiled as a funds transfer service requiring only a mobile or NRIC number.
- 29 June – Singapore's fourth desalination plant, the Keppel Marina East Desalination Plant starts construction. It will have a rooftop garden and a visitors' centre, with completion by 2020.
- 30 June – Food & beverage outlets will no longer be allowed to apply for new smoking corners, and a smoking ban in Orchard Road will take effect on 1 July 2018.

=== July ===
- 1 July – A cycling network is launched in Jurong.
- 3 July – Prime Minister Lee Hsien Loong convenes a two-day special Parliamentary session to debate the accusations of abuse of power made by his siblings in the 38 Oxley Road dispute. At the end of the debate, no evidence of abuse of power was found. Another statement was made regarding the purposes of the Ministerial Committee in charge of the house.
- 7 July - The first curious place for children, which is the Artground at Goodman Art Centre at Mountbatten is officially opened to children aged 0 to 9 to explore the fun of arts which is followed by the second outlet at One Holland Village Mall in February 2024.
- 10 July –
  - PayNow comes into operation.
  - The Sungei Road flea market is closed for good.
- 13 July – CapitaLand unveils a 280m tower that replaces the Golden Shoe Car Park. It started construction in 2018, later known as CapitaSpring. The building, which will incorporate a park at Market Street, will be completed by 2021.
- 14 July – A new viaduct adjacent to the slip road from Upper Changi Road East to PIE collapses during casting of deck, killing one construction worker and injuring 10 others.
- 17 July – The Pioneer Polyclinic opens, the first polyclinic to be built in more than 10 years.
- 18 July – Tengah Air Base will be expanded to accommodate the relocation of Paya Lebar Air Base.
- 22 July – Comic writer Sonny Liew wins three Eisner Awards for The Art of Charlie Chan Hock Chye, two years after the National Arts Council (NAC) withdrew funding for his book.
- 25 July - Tigerair completes its merger with Scoot, creating a large low cost carrier.
- 27 July – Amazon launches its services in Singapore, along with its new HQ.
- 28 July – FairPrice launches its first unstaffed, cashless Cheers store in Nanyang Polytechnic. A QR code will be required for access to the store.
- 29 July – East Coast Park will be refreshed in upgrading plans announced.

=== August ===
- 1 August – A ban on point of sale display of tobacco products takes effect to reduce the appeal of cigarettes.
- 4 August – Professor Huang Jing, a Director of Center on Asia and Globalization at Lee Kuan Yew School of Public Policy, becomes the first person known to be permanently banned from Singapore after being accused by the Ministry of Home Affairs for working with a foreign government to influence its foreign policy.
- 5 August – A construction worker dies of highly contagious bacterial infection diphtheria, the first case to resurface in 25 years.

- The new Tampines Regional Library is officially reopened at Our Tampines Hub premises.

- 6 August – Our Tampines Hub is officially opened.
- 9 August - The National Day Parade (NDP) 2017 returns to the Float at Marina Bay for its 10 year hiatus from its first parade since 2007, as well as being discovered that the Singapore Sports Hub is too costly for hosting future NDPs at the National Stadium after the previous year's parade was held there since 2016.
- 11 August – The Land Transport Authority had announced plans for the fully cashless ticketing system. Cash top-ups in Passenger Service Centres (PSCs) were terminated by March 2018, and everyone have to use the machines or ticket offices. Sale of Standard Tickets were also phased out from 2021; while all stations have changed to Top-Up Kiosks (TUK) as a result, only one or two machines allows cash payment. Cash payment is still allowed on buses following consultations from Singapore Prisons Service, Singapore Tourism Board, Immigration and Checkpoints Authority and Migrant Workers Council (MWC). Also, minimum top-up value decreased to $2 from $5 for students and $10 for adults. Also, the LTA wants everyone to be in the SimplyGo system.
- 16 August – POSB launches a smart watch for primary school children to track their saving and spending habits as part of the POSB Smart Buddy programme.
- 17 August – Singapore's first donor breast milk bank is officially launched in KK Women's and Children's Hospital.
- 20 August –
  - Singapore beat Malaysia 17-4 to win its 27th SEA Games gold medal in men's water polo. This is the country's longest winning streak in the sport.
  - Several new plans are unveiled. There will be 40,000 more pre-school places by 2022, with new Early Years Centres (EYCs) for children up to 4 years old, leading to MOE Kindergartens catering to children aged 5 and 6. The Ministry of Education will set up 50 kindergartens by 2023 compared to 15 now. In addition, a National Institute of Early Childhood Development will be set up under the National Institute of Education to raise pre-school teachers' standards. In addition, bilingual education will be emphasised at a young age. Other plans include smart lamp posts as part of the Smart Nation Sensor Platform (SNSP) for surveillance and data collection, Parking.sg app to reduce reliance on coupons, and several moves to encourage cashless transactions. Several moves to curb diabetes are announced too, with seven drink companies pledging to lower sugar content in drinks to 12 percent two days later.
- 21 August –
  - 10 US marines perished after destroyer USS John S. McCain collided with an oil tanker Alnic MC east of Singapore at 5:24am. All the bodies are found on 28 August.
  - Touche, a biometric payment method part of the POSB Smart Buddy programme, will be an option for students to pay for items in school from 2018.
- 22 August – Alipay will be launched in Singapore. Since then, Grab, NETS, Razer, among other companies have announced plans to set up cashless systems.
- 24 August – The Singapore Tourism Board and Economic Development Board launch the Passion Made Possible campaign replacing YourSingapore, used since 2010.
- 25 August –
  - A masterplan for Jurong Lake District is released by the Urban Redevelopment Authority. They include jobs, homes, and centralised infrastructure in a car-lite setting for sustainability.
  - Mediacorp announced that it will acquire Singapore Press Holdings's (SPH) stakes in Mediacorp TV (at 20 percent) and Mediacorp Press (at 40 percent) for S$18 million, which SPH will divest. This comes after Mediacorp announced that it will stop publishing the Today paper and go fully digital. In addition, Mediacorp will stop publishing any soft copy or digital format of Today that is similar to a hardcopy newspaper for five years. The acquisition is completed on 29 September.
- 29 August – The Land Transport Authority announced the scrapping of the Singapore Underground Road System. This move frees up land reserved for the project.
- 31 August –
  - Tony Tan steps down from Presidency. Chairman of the Council of Presidential Advisers J. Y. Pillay temporarily served as acting president at the time.
  - Radio station Lush 99.5FM ceases transmission.
  - Teachers' Day is extended to preschool teachers for the first time as part of a manpower plan announced on 1 October 2016.

=== September ===
- 4 September – Bukit Panjang Bus Interchange is officially opened as Singapore's ninth air-conditioned bus interchange.
- 11 September –
  - Former Minister Tan Chuan-Jin is elected Speaker of the Parliament of Singapore.
  - A new crossover track will be built at Canberra MRT station to lessen the impact of train service disruptions should they happen.
  - 2017 Presidential Election: former Speaker Halimah Yacob is announced by the Presidential Elections Commission as the only candidate issued with both the certificate of eligibility and community certificate.
- 13 September –
  - Two ships collide near Singapore waters, causing two casualties and seven injured, with another three missing.
  - Nomination day for the 2017 Presidential Election: former Speaker Halimah Yacob won the election via an uncontested walkover since she was the only candidate eligible to contest in the election (the third such walkover after 1999 and 2005), and was inaugurated as the eighth, and first female President of Singapore a day later.
- 15 September –
  - Gavin Chan dies due to injuries relating Bionix AFV in Queensland, Australia; it was the first fatality related to military training in almost five years.
  - SMRT Trains is appointed the operator of the Thomson–East Coast MRT line for an initial nine years.
  - The Singapore Grand Prix is renewed for another four years until 2021, with reduced costs for hosting it.
- 20 September - Yishun Park Hawker Centre is officially opened and managed by Tuck Shop.
- 23 September - An Asia Fighting Championship match between Pradip Subramanian and Steven Lim turns tragic, leading to the former's death.
- 28 September – Cathay Cineplexes opens its 8th branch at Parkway Parade.
- 29 September – Today stops its print edition and went fully digital after 17 years since its launch.

=== October ===
- 1 October –
  - The smoking ban is extended to autonomous universities' compounds, private hire vehicles, private education institutes, within 5m of education institutions, excursion buses and trishaws.
  - Parking.sg is launched, initially open to car users.
- 2 October – The Infrastructure Protection Act is passed to provide important buildings with adequate security measures during planning stages.
- 5 October – The Land Transport Authority signs an agreement with all five bike-sharing companies (GBikes, Mobike, oBike, ofo and SG Bike), NParks and all 16 Town Councils to deal with inconveniences caused by irresponsible bike-sharing users. They will also be required to adopt geofencing technologies by end-2017.
- 7 October – A major disruption of train services between Ang Mo Kio and Newton lasted 21 hours due to flooding in the MRT tunnels of the North–South Line, caused by a malfunctioned pump.
- 8 October - Singaporean singer Joanna Dong finishes third in Sing! China (season 2).
- 9 October – SingPost Centre reopens with after two years of retrofitting works. Also, the first Golden Village cinema using laser projection opened its doors.
- 19 October – The Housing and Development Board announced a new resale portal by 2018, cutting transaction time from 16 weeks previously to 8.
- 20 October –
  - NETS launches NETSpay, allowing users to pay through their phones. However, errors caused transactions to fail, which resolved at 3:30pm.
  - A review of transfer fares between MRT stations is announced to remove second boarding charges, thereby saving fares when walking to a nearby station.
- 21 October – The third stage of the Downtown MRT line (spanning from Fort Canning to Expo) begins operations.
- 26 October - A new version of the Singapore passport is launched with new designs featuring six Singapore landmarks and new security features.
- 30 October – The Float @ Marina Bay will be renamed to NS Square to acknowledge the contributions of National Servicemen. At the same time, the NS Gallery will be built below the new venue to showcase the importance of National Service.
- 31 October – Changi Airport Terminal 4 begins operations.

=== November ===
- 3 November – The Workers' Party's Low Thia Khiang announced that he is stepping down as Secretary-General of the Party before the next Party election to enable younger leaders to take charge. In addition, WP's town councils now run an advanced management software.
- 6 November – Radio station 938LIVE is rebranded to 938Now.
- 7 November – Amendments are passed to raise the smoking age from 18 to 21 in stages, as well as ban people from buying, using and owning imitation tobacco products such as e-cigarettes, e-cigars and e-pipes.
- 8 November – All healthcare providers will soon be required to contribute to the National Electronic Health Record, an online health record in operation since 2011.
- 11 November – The first active aging hub officially opened in Kwong Wai Shiu Hospital.
- 15 November – A train collision along the East–West MRT line between Joo Koon and Gul Circle; this was only the second train collision in the MRT history to have happen in its 30-year history, after the 1993 Clementi rail accident.
- 16 November – All new homes are required to have smoke detectors (also known as Home Fire Alarm Device (HFAD)) from June 2018, allowing for early fire alerts. Existing home owners are encouraged to install such devices.
- 20 November – The second phase of the Deep Tunnel Sewerage System starts construction. It will mainly serve western Singapore, to be completed by 2025.
- 23 November – Those born before 1 January 1962 will be able re-register their NRIC in an optional exercise come next year.
- 24 November – The Punggol Polyclinic opens.
- 25 November – NParks announced that Sembawang Hot Spring Park will be developed into a public park for everyone to enjoy. The works will finish in 2019.

=== December ===
- 1 December – Singapore Civil Defence Force ambulances can now run red lights and make unauthorised U-turns during emergencies.
- 8 December – Zero Mobile launches in Singapore as the second mobile virtual network operator (MVNO).
- 9 December – The 5-year Bus Service Enhancement Programme (BSEP) is completed, costing S$1.1b. The enhancements injected 1,000 buses and introduced 80 new services.
- 11 December – The Government has decided to partially conserve Dakota Crescent, one of the oldest housing estates in Singapore. The area will still be redeveloped for public housing.
- 12 December – BlueSG launches Singapore's first electric car sharing programme.
- 15 December – After a week's delay, the first Prudential Marina Bay Carnival opens as Singapore's biggest carnival. The carnival runs for about four months until 1 April 2018. By then, a total of 1.4 million people have visited the Carnival.
- 18 December - The Immigration and Checkpoints Authority will introduce e-PR system for permanent residency applications, first announced on 2 November.
- 19 December – Singapore Power announced that the North-South, East-West and Jurong Island Cable Tunnels will progressively start operations from end-2018.
- 20 December – Parking.sg is extended to those using motorcycles and heavy vehicles, making it available for all vehicle users at all car parks.
- 22 December – Keppel O&M agrees to pay up to US$422m in fines for a bribery case to US, Brazilian and Singapore authorities in a plea deal.
- 31 December – Emeritus Senior Minister Goh Chok Tong put out a post, hoping that a fourth-generation successor to the Prime Minister is decided by 2018, the first time a senior politician waded into the issue.

== Deaths ==
- 16 January – Amin Nasir, football player (b. 1968).
- 19 January – Juanita Melson, DJ and MRT announcer (b. 1944).
- 20 January – Choong Pei Shan and Teo Zi Ning, murder victims of the Woodlands double murders.
- 26 January – Tan See Lai, educator, newscaster (b. 1934).
- 31 January – Robert Loh, former YMCA president, 1st president of National Council of Social Service and ophthalmic surgeon (b. 1925).
- 4 February – Fong Swee Suan, trade unionist and founding member of PAP and Barisan Sosialis (b. 1931).
- 27 February – Sin Kek Tong, opposition veteran and founder of Singapore People's Party (b. 1944).
- 5 March – Ling Lee Hua, Hockchew community leader and businessman (b. 1921).
- 12 March – Satheesh Kumar Manogaran, murder victim of the St James Power Station murder (b. 1982–1983).
- 17 April – Othman Wok, former Cabinet Minister and ambassador (b. 1924).
- 22 April – Rufino Soliano, musician (b. 1932).
- 1 June – SSGT Nadzrie Bin Matin, a Traffic Police Officer succumbs to his injuries after colliding with a black van while performing his traffic patrol duties (b. 1988).
- 21 June – Chia Ngim Fong and Chin Sek Fah, murder victims of the Bedok double murder.
- 10 July – Spencer Tuppani, murder victim of Tan Nam Seng (b. 1979).
- 11 July – Maurice Baker, academic and diplomat (b. 1920).
- 13 July – Vee King Shaw, director of Shaw Organisation (b. 1944).
- 26 July – Magnus Böcker, former CEO of Singapore Exchange (b. 1961).
- 11 August – Ayeesha, murder victim of the Ayeesha child abuse case (b. 2012).
- 16 August – Mohammad Roslan Zaini, murder victim of the Teck Whye Crescent murder (b. 1982).
- 18 August – Joseph Grimberg, former Supreme Court judge and lawyer (b. 1933).
- 7 September – Duncan Watt, writer and newscaster (b. 1942).
- 24 September - Pradip Subramanian, bodybuilder & martial art coach.
- 29 October – Fung Yin Ching, former PAP and Barisan Sosialis legislative assemblywoman for Stamford Constituency (b. 1933).

== See also ==
- 2017
- History of Singapore
