= 2015 in Singapore =

- Decades: 1990s; 2000s; 2010s; 2020s
- See also: Other events of 2015; Timeline of Singaporean history

The following lists events that happened during 2015 in the Republic of Singapore.

== Incumbents ==
- President: Tony Tan Keng Yam
- Prime Minister: Lee Hsien Loong

== Events ==
=== January ===
- 1 January – The National Youth Council becomes an autonomous agency since being formed as a People's Association division in 1989.
- 3 January – The Singaporean car carrier Höegh Osaka runs aground on Bramble Bank of the Isle of Wight, in the entrance to Southampton Water.
- 14 January – First SMRT train service disruption east-bound train travelling from Joo Koon to Dover.
- 15 January – The Protection from Harassment Act comes into force.
- 23 January – JTC LaunchPad @ one-north is officially opened.
- 29 January – The Liquor Control (Supply and Consumption) Act is passed in Parliament. The law bans drinking in public from 10:30pm to 7am and designates Liquor Control Zones in Geylang and Little India, which took effect on 1 April.

=== February ===
- 11 February – BASH is launched for startups.
- 16 February – JTC Corporation and Temasek Holdings have agreed to merge their subsidiaries to better compete in Asia, first announced on 4 September 2014. The mergers will involve Ascendas and Singbridge, as well as Surbana and Jurong International Holdings. The merger is completed on 10 June, resulting in the formation of Ascendas–Singbridge (since acquired by CapitaLand) and Surbana Jurong.
- 26 February – Paya Lebar Square shopping centre is officially opened in Paya Lebar, Singapore.
- 27 February – The new Yishun Integrated Transport Hub is announced to replace the existing Yishun Bus Interchange by 2019, with operations moving to a temporary interchange on 14 March.

=== March ===
- March – Capitol Piazza is opened to the public as part of Capitol.
- 10 March – A memorial was launched to commemorate the MacDonald House bombing that happened 50 years earlier.
- 11 March – Innosparks (an ST Engineering subsidiary) launches the AIR+ Smart Mask, which consists of a Smart Mask and the AIR+; a micro ventilator. This will help keep those wearing the mask cool, while giving protection from the haze and pollutants. It is able to fit people of all ages including children and the elderly.
- 13 March – Laws were passed to clarify that landowners can use up to 30 m underground below the Singapore Height Datum, and allow for acquisition of underground space.
- 16 March – WE Cinemas opens a new multiplex in 321 Clementi, which also opened on the same day. This marked WE Cinemas' re-entry into the cinema business.
- 23–29 March – Death and state funeral of Lee Kuan Yew:
  - 23 March –
    - Singapore's first and former Prime Minister Lee Kuan Yew, notable for his contributions as an "Architect of Modern Singapore", dies aged 91 due to complications of pneumonia.
    - Prime Minister Lee Hsien Loong (who was also the son of the late Lee) declared a seven-day period of national mourning and the funeral will be held on 29 March. The state flags on all government buildings would be flown at half-mast for the mourning period, while a majority of television programmings were preempted to air a selected series of programs in tribute of Lee.
  - 25 March –
    - The funeral procession of Lee from the Istana to Parliament House to lay in state. Later on the same day, the house was opened to Singapore who queued to pay their last respects to Lee.
  - 29 March –
    - The funeral procession of Lee from the Parliament House to National University of Singapore (NUS) University Cultural Centre.
    - Lee's body was cremated and interred at Mandai Crematorium and Columbarium.
- 24 March – The first batch of trainees who signed up as part of SAF Volunteer Corps enlisted.
- 29 March – Amos Yee was arrested for insensitive remarks. He was charged and found guilty, with a jail term imposed.

=== April ===
- 1 April –
  - xinmsn ceased operation and its services was transferred to MSN Singapore and Toggle.
  - The Cyber Security Agency is formed under the Prime Minister's Office to oversee cybersecurity matters, taking over the Singapore Infocomm Technology Security Authority and the Singapore Computer Emergency Response Team. The agency is first announced on 27 January.
- 6 April – The Police Operations Command Centre is officially launched as Singapore Police Force's new nerve centre.
- 8 April – The Puss in Boots' Giant Journey ride opens in Universal Studios Singapore.
- 30 April – Genting Hotel in Jurong was opened, making it the first hotel in west Singapore.

=== May ===
- 1 May – Fast food chain Wendy's closes its last outlet in National University of Singapore.
- 5 May – Jurong East was chosen as the Singapore terminus of the Kuala Lumpur–Singapore High Speed Rail, resulting in Jurong Country Club's acquisition on 11 May.
- 11 May – New laws to regulate the use of drones are passed. The laws, also known as the Unmanned Aircraft (Public Safety and Security) Act, have come into force on 1 June.
- 15 May – Singapore Botanical Gardens gets ICOMOS nod to be the first UNESCO World Heritage Site.
- 19 May –
  - Capitol Theatre was reopened as part of Capitol.
  - Opposition candidate Goh Meng Seng reveals plans to set up People's Power Party.
- 21 May – Construction starts on Outram Community Hospital, which will be completed by 2020.
- 23 May – LionsXII wins the Malaysian FA Cup for the first time after beating Kelantan, 3–1 in the final at the National Stadium, Bukit Jalil.
- 27 May – Battlestar Galactica reopens in Universal Studios Singapore after a two–year closure with new two–seater vehicles.
- 29 May – The National Arts Council (NAC) withdraws funding for The Art of Charlie Chan Hock Chye. On 3 June, the NAC added that the book could undermine legitimacy of the Singapore government, thus going against NAC funding rules.
- 31 May – A police shooting took place when a suspect attempted to escape from a police stop, killing one. Two other suspects were arrested and sentenced for drug offences.

=== June ===
- 5–16 June – 2015 Southeast Asian Games was held.
- 5 June – 2015 Sabah earthquake: At least nine people, mostly from Tanjong Katong Primary School (TKPS) were killed when an earthquake measuring 6.0 on Richter scale struck Mount Kinabalu and Ranau in the state of Sabah, Malaysia. A National mourning happened for the victims on 8 June, and flags were flown half-mast. As of 10 June, 11 victims were reported after two more were found on Kinabalu.
- 15 June – The Infocomm Development Authority allows all telcos to shut 2G services from 1 April 2017 to free up capacity for newer 4G services, as well as low subscribership.
- 20 June – A police officer was shot by a suspect in Khoo Teck Puat Hospital. The suspect was sentenced to life with caning in 2018.
- 22 June – Surbana Jurong is launched, along with the announcement of several acquisitions to boost its regional standing.
- 23 June –
  - The third satellite blood collection centre opens in Jurong East.
  - Pasir Panjang Phases 3 and 4 are officially opened, making port processes efficient.
- 26 June – The first 4 C830C trains begin operations on the Circle MRT line.
- 27 June –
  - Kupang LRT station is opened for service, along with more trips added, completing the Sengkang LRT line.
  - The Bukit Panjang Integrated Transport Hub is delayed to 2017 due to canal diversion works. In addition, a new slip road to Kranji Expressway will be ready by 2017 with a flyover to finish this year.
  - The first batch of trainees in SAF Volunteer Corps complete Basic Training.
- 30 June – The Ng Teng Fong General Hospital is opened, along with Jurong Community Hospital. The hospitals are officially opened on 10 October 2015.

=== July ===
- 3 July – The first littoral mission vessel (LMV) is launched, going fully operational in 2017. The ships, which are designed and built locally, will have eight ships when fully commissioned.
- 4 July – The 156-year-old Singapore Botanic Gardens becomes the first site to receive the status of World Heritage Site by UNESCO.
- 7 July – The North South and East West lines are disrupted due to a power fault, making it one of the worst MRT disruptions since 2011.
- 13 July –
  - General Elections: The Electoral Boundaries Review Committee is announced in Parliament, having been formed two months ago.
  - Amendments to the Constitution are passed to include Temasek into the Net Investment Returns framework from 2016.
- 14 July – The Sentosa Line, a gondola lift, is opened as a way to get around Sentosa.
- 24 July – General Elections: The Electoral Boundaries Review Committee report is released. The 13th parliament will consist of 89 members from 29 constituencies (13 Single Member Constituencies and 16 Group Representation Constituencies), up from 87 seats from the current 27 constituencies.
- 26 July – The Singapore Sports Hub is officially opened with "Youth Celebrate" held there to commemorate Youth Day.

=== August ===
- 9 August – Singapore celebrates its Golden Jubilee at Padang.
- 11 August – Minister for Transport Lui Tuck Yew announced his retirement from politics.
- 12 August – The Institute of Southeast Asian Studies (ISEAS) is renamed to ISEAS–Yusof Ishak Institute to honour Yusof Ishak, Singapore's first President.
- 17 August – The Organised Crime Act is passed to give authorities more power to act against organised crime groups.
- 18 August – The set of six SG50 commemorative notes are unveiled by the Monetary Authority of Singapore (MAS).
- 25 August –
  - The Land Transport Authority announced that the Jurong Region MRT line could be extended through West Coast, terminating at Haw Par Villa MRT station of the Circle MRT line.
  - The 12th Parliament is dissolved.

=== September ===
- 1 September – Nomination Day for the General Elections: Once nominations closed, none of the constituencies are returned via walkover making it the first general election (post–independence) which every Singaporean is eligible to vote, last seen in 1963.
- 11 September – Polling day for the General Elections:
  - The ruling People's Action Party (PAP), led by Lee Hsien Loong, retains its majority in the elections with 83 out of 89 seats, with an overall vote share of 69.86%.
  - Main opposition Workers' Party (WP) wins the remaining six seats from the other two constituencies (Aljunied GRC and Hougang SMC). Punggol East SMC won by the Workers' Party in the 2013 Punggol East by-election is returned to the PAP.
- 15 September –
  - The 6th incineration plant will be built in Tuas, to be completed by 2019.
  - After 8 years in operation, DBS Bank announced that The Islamic Bank of Asia will cease operations.
  - The current State Courts Building will be retrofitted by 2023 once the State Courts Complex is completed in 2019. The current State Courts Building will eventually house the Family Justice Courts.
- 16 September – The FairPrice Hub is officially opened in Joo Koon, a state-of-the-art distribution centre.
- 17 September – 3688, a film on getai is shown in cinemas.
- 24 September – The haze in Singapore reached a hazardous range of 313; Ministry of Education prompted to close primary and secondary schools on 25 September as a health precaution due to the haze.
- 28 September – Prime Minister Lee Hsien Loong announced a new Cabinet with three Coordinating Ministers.

=== October ===
- 1 October –
  - Marrybrown opens its first restaurant in iFly Singapore in Sentosa.
  - The first C751C train begins operation on the North East MRT line.
- 6 October – The Singapore General Hospital reveals a Hepatitis C outbreak where 22 patients (four deaths inclusive) are infected with the first case detected on 17 April. As of 8 December, 3 more infections and 4 deaths were disclosed, bringing the total to 25 patients infected (8 deaths inclusive).
- 9 October – A freak lift accident occurs in Jurong, causing an elderly woman's hands to be severed.
- 19 October –
  - Fusionopolis 2 is officially opened.
  - Due to the haze, PM2.5 levels reached a record-high of 471 at 11 pm in Western Singapore.
- 21 October – City Harvest Church Criminal Breach of Trust Case: The six City Harvest Church leaders involved in the largest charity fund misuse case (S$50 million) back in 2010 and their arrest in 2012 are all found guilty over breach of trust and Falsification of Accounts. On 20 November, all six convicted are given jail sentences, with Kong Hee given the heaviest sentence of 8 years.
- 29 October – Stage 6 of the Circle MRT line is announced during a visit to the Tuas Extension, resulting in a full circle. The extension will consist of 3 stations along the future Great Southern Waterfront, stretching a total distance of 4 km. The extension will be completed by 2025. To support these expansions, Kim Chuan Depot will be expanded to store more trains and includes a bus depot aboveground.

=== November ===
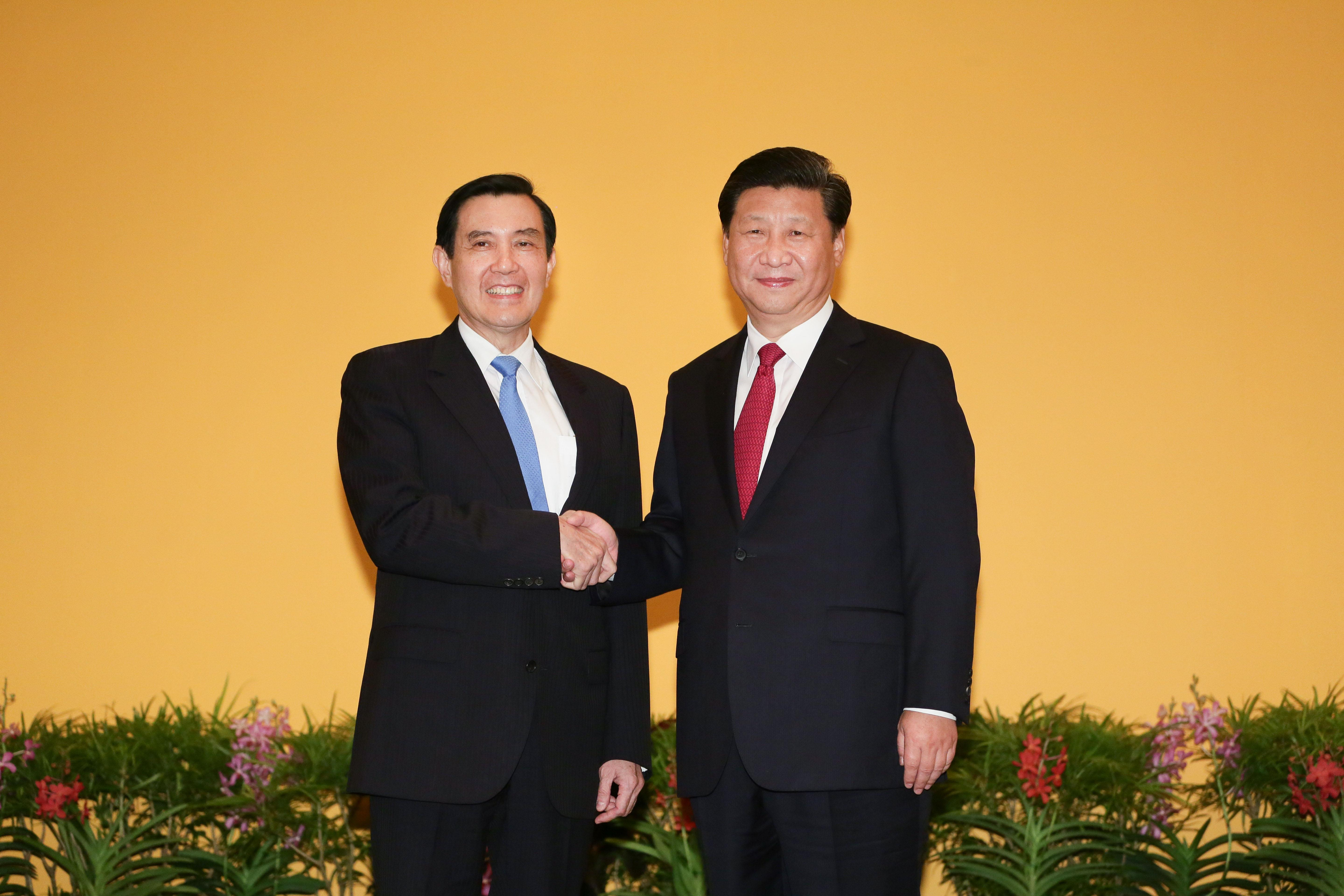
Ma Ying-jeou and Xi Jinping shaking hands at the Ma–Xi meeting

- 1 November – MediShield Life is launched for all Singaporeans.
- 7 November – The leaders of China and Taiwan met in Singapore, the first such meeting between the leaders of the two sides of the Taiwan Strait since the end of the Chinese Civil War.
- 21 November – Joo Koon Bus Interchange officially opened as Singapore's eighth air-conditioned bus interchange.
- 22 November – Construction starts on the new Woodlands Police Division with completion by 2018.
- 24 November –
  - The National Gallery Singapore, an art museum, officially opened.
  - United Overseas Bank (UOB) launches the UOB Mighty app.
- 25 November – The Media Development Authority lifts a ban on 240 publications after a review, with some spanning decades ago. However, 17 publications will still be banned.

=== December ===
- 3–9 December – 2015 ASEAN Para Games was held in Singapore.
- 4 December –
  - The second season of the critically acclaimed television drama The Dream Makers, which would go on to win a record-number accolades in Singapore, premieres on MediaCorp Channel 8.
  - A mass food poisoning case occurred where about 150 people were infected with Group B streptococcal disease after consuming freshwater fish prepared raw. The next day, the Ministry of Health announced a ban on using freshwater fish for raw dishes.
- 6 December – Bulim Bus Depot was officially opened during a carnival. This is the first bus depot funded by the Land Transport Authority after a shift to the bus contracting system.
- 7 December – Temasek will sell Neptune Orient Lines to CMA CGM. The transaction was completed in 2016.
- 8 December – National broadcaster Mediacorp opens its new campus at Mediapolis@one-north, at the same time unveiling a new logo, starting a move from Caldecott.
- 10 December – CapitaLand announced the redevelopment of Funan DigitaLife Mall into a creative hub, with the mall shut in the third quarter of 2016. The redevelopment will be completed after three years.
- 15 December – The first phase of the ban on emerging tobacco products like smokeless cigarettes and dissolvable tobacco comes into effect. This is done in a bid to protect the public.
- 22 December – 2-car trains have started operating on the Sengkang LRT line.
- 27 December – The second phase of the Downtown line (which spans from Bukit Panjang to Rochor) opens.
- 28 December – Yishun Community Hospital opens to the public.

== Deaths ==
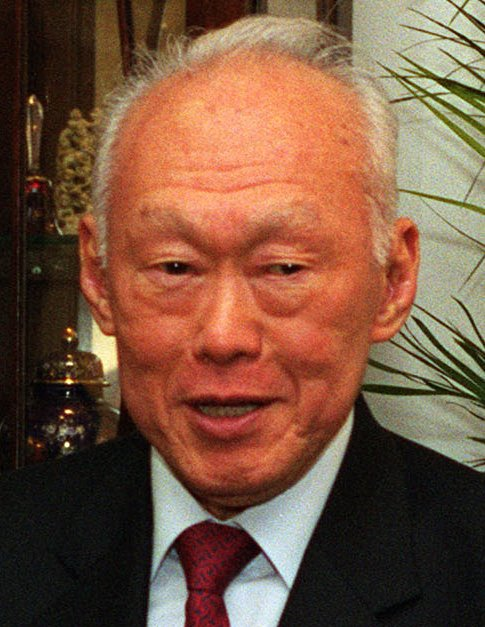
Lee Kuan Yew

- 7 January – Subhas Anandan, Criminal defence lawyer (b. 1947).
- 24 January – Ho Kok Hoe, pioneer artist, architect and former Labour Front city councillor for River Valley Constituency (b. 1922).
- 1 February – Chok Chai Mun, Hakka community leader and businessman (b. 1921).
- 12 February – Koh Lip Lin, education pioneer and former PAP Member of Parliament for Nee Soon Constituency and Nee Soon South SMC (b. 1936).
- 14 March – Nurshahrin Shahrudin, National silat athlete (b. 1994).
- 23 March – Lee Kuan Yew, 1st Prime Minister of Singapore (b. 1923).
- 2 April – James de Beaujeu Domville, theatre producer (b. 1933).
- 8 April – Bernard Chen, former Minister of State for Defence and former PAP Member of Parliament for Radin Mas Constituency, Clementi Constituency, Pasir Panjang GRC and West Coast GRC (b. 1942).
- 13 April – Annie Ee, murder victim of Tan Hui Zhen and Pua Hak Chuan (b. 1988).
- 7 August – Lee Seng Wee, Ex-OCBC Bank chairman and billionaire banker (b. 1930).
- 17 August – Bernard Rodrigues, former PAP legislative assemblyman for Telok Blangah Constituency (b. 1933).
- 26 August – Teong Eng Siong, former PAP Member of Parliament for Sembawang Constituency (b. 1936).
- 3 September – Atika binte Dolkifli, murder victim in the Toa Payoh carpark murder (b. 1992).
- 5 September – Goh Eng Wah, founder of Eng Wah Global (b. 1923).
- 14 October – Miranda Yap, executive Director of the Bioprocessing Technology Institute at the Agency for Science, Technology and Research of Singapore (A*STAR) (b. 1948)
- 27 October – Tan Keong Choon, industrialist, rubber tycoon and nephew of Tan Kah Kee (b. 1918).
- 16 November – Kwek Leng Joo, businessman (b. 1953).
- 1 December – Wong Soon Fong, former PAP and Barisan Sosialis legislative assemblyman for Toa Payoh Constituency (b. 1934).
- 20 December – Tan Chok Kian, 12th Chairman of the Central Provident Fund (b. 1931).
- 28 December
  - Tiffany Leong, Ex-Mediacorp actress (b. 1985).
  - Tan Boon Chiang, 2nd President of the Industrial Arbitration Court (b. 1923).
