= Tan See Lai =

Singaporean newscaster (1935–2017)

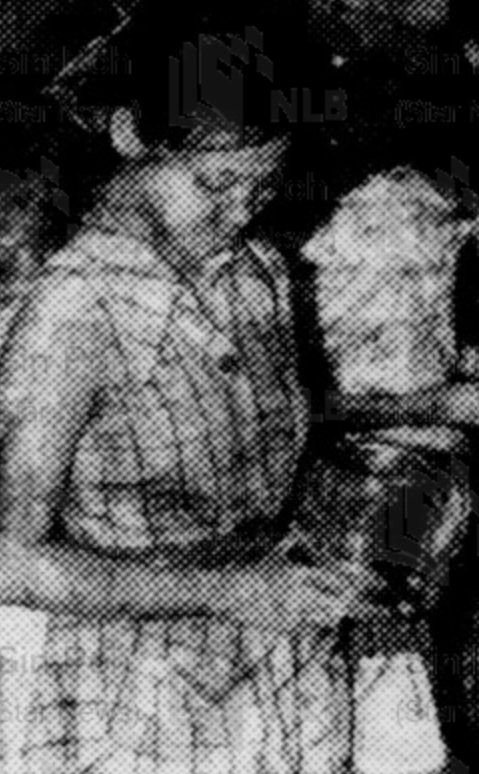
Tan at a school event in 1953.

Tan See Lai (1935 – 26 January 2017) was a pioneering Singaporean newscaster, television producer and educator. She served as the deputy director of the Division of Education Technology of the Curriculum Development Institute of Singapore and produced, presented and directed several of its programmes. She then served as the director of the ministry's Information and Services Division. Tan was the country's first female newscaster and was involved in the establishment of the Singapore International School in Hong Kong.

== Early life and education ==
Tan was born in 1935 in Singapore. Her father had served with the British Army during World War II and surrendered to the Japanese, after which he disappeared. She and her newly-widowed mother went to live with relatives and fled with them to the Cameron Highlands in Malaysia, only returning after the end of the Japanese Occupation of Singapore in 1945. The two then lived off of an allowance provided by the Widows' and Orphans' Pension Fund and Tan soon began attending the Raffles Girls' School.

Tan initially wished to become a lawyer, though her mother insisted that she should be either a nurse or a teacher because she was a woman. As such, after she completed her O-Level examinations, she went to a nearby school and asked the principal to hire her as a teacher. The principal instead told her to attend courses at the Teachers' Training College. Tan then successfully applied for a special course at the college which was intended for "high-flyers", which allowed her to study full-time for two years while receiving a monthly allowance. She graduated from the college in 1953.

== Career ==
After graduating from the college, Tan was posted to the Haig Girls' School as a teacher, remaining there until at least 1955. She then began teaching at the Cedar Girls' Secondary School soon after. She was reportedly frequently asked to serve as an emcee for school events because she "spoke well, with clear diction and enunciation". In 1958, Tan was awarded a scholarship to study at the Royal Central School of Speech and Drama in London. She left in September, remaining there for three years and graduating from the school with a diploma in 1961. She was reportedly the first Asian woman to receive a diploma from the school. Tan returned to Singapore in August and began teaching a speech and drama course at the Teachers' Training College in September. The following year, she produced and directed a local adaptation of The Tempest featuring students of the college, staged at the institution's open-air stage on 27 and 28 July. "Thespis" of The Straits Times opined that the production was "of really high standard, and not the least of its fascination was the Asian dress in which it was played." In 1963, Tan was hired at the newly-established Television Singapura as a part-time newscaster, becoming the first female newscaster in Singapore. She also produced and presented the programme Women's World. The talk show was, according to Jeanette Tan of Mothership, "probably one of Singapore's first women's shows".

In 1967, Tan left teaching to join the newly-established Educational Television Service unit of the Ministry of Education as one of its three producers. The unit was to produce educational programmes for students at schools. She produced The Power of Worlds, which won a special prize at the International Education Programme Contest in Japan in November 1967. The following year, she produced and directed the programme The Good Earth, which won the same prize at the International Education Programme Contest. She also produced an English-language television adaptation of Lady Precious Stream in this period. In the same year, she received a grant from the United States Department of State Educational and Cultural Exchange for a 75-day study tour in the United States. Tan was awarded the Public Service Star on National Day in 1989. By October 1976, Tan had been appointed the unit's Deputy Head of Audiovisual Media. By February 1979, she had instead been appointed the Assistant Director of Audiovisual Media. The Straits Times reported in January 1980 that although Tan was the Assistant Director of Audiovisual Media, she was also performing the duties of Deputy Director of Media, though she had not received a letter of appointment for the role.

When Goh Keng Swee, who had been appointed the Minister for Education the previous year, asked her what would happen if the Education Television Service was closed down, she claimed to have told him that "nothing" would happen as the ETV was "so hard to use and [there was] not enough money." He then appointed her the deputy director of the Division of Education Technology and provided the unit, which was to come under the Curriculum Development Institute of Singapore, with additional funding. She was reportedly one of the first women to serve as a deputy director in the Singapore civil service. At the 1982 National Day Awards, Tan received the Public Administration Medal (Bronze). In November 1987, she was appointed the Director of the Information and Services Division of the Ministry of Education and was succeeded by Maureen Ng as deputy director of the Department of Educational Technology. At the 1989 National Day Awards, Tan received the Long Service Award. Tan was involved in the founding of the Singapore International School in September 1991. She aided in the designing of its curriculum and the hiring of staff. After retiring, she continued to teach English and phonetics there.

== Personal life and death ==
Tan died of renal failure at the Singapore General Hospital on 26 January 2017. She was cremated at the Mandai Crematorium. Tan was posthumously inducted into the Singapore Women's Hall of Fame in 2024.
