= SURS =

SURS may refer to:

- Singapore Underground Road System, an underground road proposal in Singapore since scrapped.
- State Universities Retirement System, a government agency of the U.S. state of Illinois
- Statistični urad Republike Slovenije (Statistical Office of the Republic of Slovenia), an independent institution in charge of official statistical surveying.
