= Bedok double murder =

2017 murders of an elderly couple in Singapore

- Chia Ngim Fong (right) and Chin Sek Fah
- Location: Bedok, Singapore
- Date: 21 June 2017
- Attack type: Murder
- Weapon: Wooden stool
- Deaths: 2
- Injuries: 0
- Victims: Chin Sek Fah (78); Chia Ngim Fong (79)
- Perpetrator: Khasanah (41)
- Motive: Escape to Indonesia and avoid hindrance of escape plot
- Coroners: Singapore; Kamala Ponnampalam
- Charges: Indonesia; Premeditated murder (x2); Theft; Singapore; Murder (x2)
- Verdict: Indonesia; Khasanah found guilty of murder Sentenced to life imprisonment on 2 May 2018; commuted to 20 years after appeal on 15 August 2018; Singapore; No conviction, but found guilty by coroner's verdict
- Convictions: Indonesia; Premeditated murder (x2); Theft; Singapore; None
- Convicted: Khasanah (41)
- Judge: Indonesia; Unknown

On 21 June 2017, 41-year-old Indonesian maid Khasanah murdered her 79-year-old Singaporean employer Chia Ngim Fong (Chinese: 谢任方; pinyin: Xìe Rènfāng) and Chia's 78-year-old wife Chin Sek Fah (Chinese: 陈雪华; pinyin: Chén Xuěhuá) at the couple's flat in Bedok Reservoir Road, Singapore. It was alleged that Khasanah, who resented being scolded by Chin and was unhappy working for the couple, decided to flee the country. In her escape plans, she restrained the couple by gagging and tying them up, before killing them by battering Chia with a stool and stomping onto Chin. Khasanah fled to Indonesia, where she spent a week on the run before she was arrested by the Indonesian police for the double murder, which became known as the Bedok double murder.

Khasanah was not extradited back to Singapore for trial, as Indonesian law decreed that Indonesian citizens, if arrested in Indonesia after committing a crime in a foreign jurisdiction, should be tried in Indonesia instead of the foreign jurisdiction. The Singapore Police Force (SPF) and the Indonesian National Police (POLRI) hence coordinated to solve the case. From February to May 2018, Khasanah stood trial in an Indonesian court for the double murder, for which she was found guilty and sentenced to life imprisonment. The life sentence was lowered to 20 years' jail on appeal. A Singaporean coroner's inquiry was conducted in September 2020, three years after the crime; State Coroner Kamala Ponnampalam found Khanasah guilty of murder in absentia after determining that the deaths of Chia and Chin were an unlawful killing that she had perpetuated.

== Double murder ==
On the afternoon of 21 June 2017, at about 3.39pm, an elderly couple were discovered dead by their nephew in their 6th-floor HDB flat at Bedok Reservoir Road.

The victims were identified as 79-year-old Chia Ngim Fong and his 78-year-old wife Chin Sek Fah, who both stayed together with one of their two sons at the flat. The son, who went to work at 9am on that same day, was unable to contact his parents; their nephew discovered both of them dead after proceeding to check on them. The couple were found with their limbs tied, with only Chia having bloodstains and visible injuries on his body, and several items were missing from their house. They had three daughters and two sons at death. A 28-year-old undergraduate told the police that, at around 3 p.m., he heard shouts coming from near where the Chias lived. Chia was reportedly described to have mobility problems and suffered a small stroke.

Neighbours said that the couple were known to be friendly and loving. A 68-year-old retiree, who lived on the same floor as the Chias, said that she often saw the couple going out together, that they had lived in the flat for more than 30 years, and that she found Chin to be "very happy-go-lucky and chatty", while Chia was slightly more quiet. A 63-year-old retiree named Said Nasir, who lived two floors below the Chias, expressed his shock over the double murder; he said that he often saw the couple and greeted each other as they went to send meals for their children, one of whom owned a foreign maid agency in Bukit Timah. Before their retirement, the couple owned a department store from 1977 to 1990, and also ran three shops selling shoes, beauty products and other items till 2000.

Known as the Bedok double murder, the murders of Chia Ngim Fong and Chin Sek Fah were considered as one of Singapore's most shocking crimes (also including the murder of Spencer Tuppani and Woodlands double murders) to happen during the year 2017.

== Arrest of Khasanah ==
The police classified the double deaths of Chin Sek Fah and Chia Ngim Fong as murder, and they publicly appealed for witnesses to assist in their investigations. Later on, the police managed to identify one suspect, who was the couple's Indonesian maid Khasanah. Khasanah, who went by one name, was 41 years old and had worked for the couple for one month, but her whereabouts were unknown at that point when her employers were discovered dead. Based on further investigations, Khasanah was believed to have fled Singapore for an Indonesian island, as there were evidence of Khasanah reportedly boarding a ferry out of Singapore, which was bound to either Batam or Tanjung Balai on Great Karimun Island. From this, Khasanah was officially wanted by the Singaporean police on charges of murder and the Singapore Police Force also sought the assistance of their Indonesian counterparts to arrest Khasanah. Under Singaporean law, an offender found guilty of murder could be sentenced to death by hanging or to life imprisonment.

Further reports also revealed that Khasanah was employed through the agency of the couple's son, and the couple's godson, who worked at the agency and hired Khasanah, reportedly expressed remorse during an interview for having indirectly caused his godparents' deaths by hiring the same maid who allegedly killed them, and his sister tried to dissuade him from blaming himself. The couple's family also stated that Chia and Chin had always treated the maid well and even brought her along during their outings, and they were unable to find any reason why Khasanah would murder Chia and his wife, and they also expressed their desire for justice to be served no matter how long it took.

A week after the Bedok double murder, at Hotel Nanber in Tungkal Ilir, Jambi province, Sumatra, the Indonesian police managed to arrest Khasanah inside her hotel room after receiving a tip-off. Among the items found in Khasanah's possession were several pieces of jewellery, watches, mobile phones, a laptop and cash amounting to no more than $300 in various currencies. It was revealed through the press that Khasanah had hidden inside the engine room of a ferry bound for Indonesia, which was why she was able to leave Singapore without a passport, and she even registered herself with her own identity card at the same hotel where she was caught, and also frequented a nearby internet cafe for three days. Syartini, the 54-year-old hotel owner who allowed Khasanah to stay at his hotel, was reportedly shocked to see the police arriving to apprehend Khasanah for the Bedok double murders, and he stated he would have reported Khasanah to the police had he knew about her atrocities, and he also told police that Khasanah had plans to leave for Java as of the time when she was arrested.

Luthfi, the internet cafe owner, also told reporters that normally, his store was frequented by young men or teenage boys who came to play games, but Khasanah caught his attention for coming to read the news on the Internet and he thus felt something was amiss. Another man, 24-year-old Hariyanto, stated that he saw Khasanah was searching specifically for news about a murder in Singapore, and after finding out there was a double murder suspect who happened to share the same name as Khasanah, he and his same-aged friend Tommy became suspicious. Tommy also said that Khasanah once mentioned about going to a pesantren (Islamic boarding school) "to make amends", and it made him feel suspicious since the Indonesian police had, in recent months arrested several pesantren staff and students over suspected extremist beliefs. The most important detail was, a witness also overheard Khasanah talking to someone on the phone about her killing two people while at the internet cafe. Luthfi later confirmed it was one of his customers who alerted the police about Khasanah.

Although she was arrested, Khasanah, however, would not be sent back to Singapore to face trial for the murders, because under the Indonesian law of "Personaliteit", an Indonesian citizen who committed an offence overseas but was arrested in Indonesia should only be put on trial in Indonesia for the particular offence they committed outside their home country. However, a police spokesman Setyo Wasisto of the Indonesian National Police promised to fully cooperate with the Singaporean authorities to help them investigate the Bedok double murder, and the Singapore Police Force agreed with work together with the Indonesian police to solve the case. An extradition treaty in 2007 was signed by both Singapore and Indonesia but it was not yet ratified by the Indonesian parliament as of 2017, the year when Khasanah was arrested.

On the side of Indonesian law, an offence of murder carried a possible jail term of up to 20 years, life imprisonment or the death penalty by firing squad. A police spokesperson for the Indonesian police stated that Khasanah, who reportedly confessed to murdering Chia and Chin, was believed to have planned the murders and her actions could constitute as an offence of premeditated murder, and he believed Khasanah could possibly be jailed for 20 years or executed by firing squad under Indonesian law should she be convicted by the Central Jakarta District Court, where Khasanah's trial was scheduled to take place. The case of Khasanah's trial in Indonesia for a crime committed overseas brought renewed attention to the case of Harnoko Dewantoro, an Indonesian serial killer who was sentenced to death by an Indonesian court in 1995 for murdering his brother and two others over a business deal at Los Angeles.

== Background of Khasanah ==
Khasanah
- Khasanah, who was tried in Indonesia for murdering her employers in Singapore
- Born: Khasanah; 10 August 1976 (age 50); Kebumen Regency, Central Java, Indonesia
- Other name: Ana Abdul Muis
- Occupations: Maid (former); Chicken rice seller (former)
- Children: 4
- Status: Incarcerated in an Indonesian prison since 2018
- Motive: Escape to Indonesia
- Convictions: Indonesia; Premeditated murder (x2); Theft; Singapore; None
- Criminal charges: Indonesia; Premeditated murder (x2); Theft; Singapore; Murder (x2)
- Penalty: Indonesia; Life imprisonment, commuted to 20 years' jail Singapore; None

Born on 10 August 1976, Khasanah, also known as Ana Abdul Muis, was born as the sixth child in a family of eight children in Kebumen Regency in Central Java, Indonesia, although she went to school in Jakarta and also lived there. Khasanah married in 1996 and had four children – two sons and two daughters – before the couple divorced in 2011. Prior to 2017, Khasanah started working in Malaysia in 2008 for three years, and she first arrived in Singapore on 3 March 2017 to work as a maid for a Singaporean family, although Indonesian court documents showed that Khasanah was unhappy working for the family since she was subjected to verbal abuse on a daily basis. Khasanah endured it for two months until 6 May 2017, Khasanah threatened to jump from her employer's apartment if she did not allow her to resign, and her request was granted after the employer agreed to send her back to the maid agency. On 25 May 2017, Khasanah was employed as a maid for the second time in Singapore, after 79-year-old Chia Ngim Fong, who would become one of Khasanah's murder victims, hired her to work in their flat in Bedok Reservoir Road. At one point, Khasanah had started a chicken rice stall with a friend in Jakarta after working in Singapore for some time as a maid, but the business failed and she lost a lot of money, and she thus decided to return to Singapore to work in order to support her 16-year-old son.

== Indonesian court process ==
With the efforts of both the Singaporean and Indonesian police organizations, Khasanah was charged with multiple counts of premeditated murder and theft, and she was brought to trial in an Indonesian court from 27 February to 2 May 2018. During the proceedings, investigating officers of the Singapore Police Force presented their investigative findings in court and there were also witnesses being summoned from Singapore to testify in Indonesia, some through video-link in court. Consequently, Khasanah was found guilty of the double murder and sentenced to life imprisonment, the second-highest punishment authorized by Indonesia for murder.

In the aftermath of her trial, Khasanah appealed to the Jakarta High Court, and on 15 August 2018, the court upheld Khasanah's conviction but reduced Khasanah's life term to 20 years' imprisonment, the third-highest penalty warranted for murder in Indonesia, but no reasons were given behind the reduction of Khasanah's sentence. Khasanah is presently serving her jail term at an Indonesian prison for the double murder since 2018, with her estimated release date would be latest in 2038.

== Coroner's inquiry in Singapore ==
On 1 September 2020, three years after the Bedok double murders, the case was brought forward for hearing in a coroner's court in Singapore, which was presided over by State Coroner Kamala Ponnampalam, an ex-prosecutor who formerly prosecuted Filipino maid Flor Contemplacion for murder; Contemplacion was sentenced to death and later hanged on 17 March 1995 for murdering a four-year-old boy and the boy's Filipino maid.

During the coroner's inquiry, the full details of Khasanah's case were finally brought to light for the first time, some of which were from the Indonesian court documents of Khasanah's crime as shared by the Indonesian Supreme Court. The coroner's court was told that for nearly a month while she was employed by Chia Ngim Fong, Khasanah was dissatisfied and unhappy with working for the elderly couple. Additionally, Khasanah disliked Chia's wife Chin Sek Fah for scolding her. On 21 June 2017, after seeing her passport inside a cupboard she was cleaning inside Chia's bedroom, Khasanah decided to run away to Indonesia, and she was reportedly inspired by a movie, The Revenger Queen, to tie the couple up before making her escape. Khasanah made her first move by attacking Chia Ngim Fong, who was then inside the bedroom lying sideways on her bed, with his back facing Khasanah. Chia had his hands tied with raffia string and Khasanah tried to use duct tape to seal his mouth, but Chia shouted and to drown out his cries for help, Khasanah switched on the television and turned the volume high up, and she thus set upon Chia by hitting and punching Chia, until she saw Chia bleeding profusely on the face. According to Khasanah's statements, she panicked upon seeing the blood on Chia's face and in response, she grabbed a wooden stool and used it to repeatedly hit Chia on the head, until he no longer moved.

After murdering Chia, Khasanah targeted Chin next, after Chin stumbled upon her husband's murder and confronted Khasanah soon after. Khasanah reportedly pushed down Chin, who fell down the floor, and Khasanah thus used raffia string to tie up Chin's limbs. Chin continually struggled even after she was bound to the towel railing in the bathroom, and so Khasanah held on to the bathroom sink and proceeded to repeatedly stomp onto Chin's body until she became motionless, before she left Singapore for Indonesia with her passport and the valuables she stole from the couple's flat. According to Assistant Superintendent of Police (ASP) Mahathir Mohamad, who was in charge of the investigations by the Singaporean police, he testified that an autopsy on the victims confirmed that both Chin and Chia had died from blunt force trauma, and he also informed the coroner's court that Khasanah had been dealt with by the Indonesian judiciary for the double murders she committed in Singapore. ASP Mahathir also testified that the police found bloody fingerprints left by Khasanah in the master bedroom toilet in the flat and the DNA test confirmed that the blood belonged to Chia. Despite Khasanah's earlier claim that she fled Singapore without a passport, the records from the Immigration and Checkpoints Authority (ICA) confirmed that on the same date she murdered Chia and Chin, Khasanah indeed used a passport to leave Singapore via a ferry bound for Batam at the Harbourfront Cruise Centre.

After a two-day hearing, on 2 September 2020, State Coroner Kamala Ponnampalam recorded a verdict of murder, effectively finding Khasanah guilty of murdering both Chia Ngim Fong and Chin Sek Fah in absentia, even though it was not a formal conviction. State Coroner Kamala stated in her judgement that she was satisfied that based on the objective evidence presented in the coroner's court, the deaths of both Chia and his wife were part of an unlawful killing committed by Khasanah, since it was proven that Khasanah tied up the couple in order to stop them from hindering her plans to escape to Indonesia, before she mercilessly battered and stomped them to their deaths, and thereafter fled with her passport and some of the valuables from the couple's flat. State Coroner Kamala also offered her condolences to the deceased couple's surviving relatives, who were not present in court to hear the inquiry. At the time when the coroner's verdict was issued, the couple's son continued to live at the flat where his parents died.

== See also ==
- List of major crimes in Singapore
- Law of Indonesia
