= Viddsee =

Video entertainment platform

Viddsee Pte Ltd

- Screenshot
- Company type: Privately held company
- Website type: Video hosting service
- Available in: English, Chinese (partial), Indonesian (partial)
- Founded: January 2013; 13 years ago
- Headquarters: Ayer Rajah, Singapore
- Area served: Asia
- Founders: Ho Jia Jian, Derek Tan
- Website: www.viddsee.com
- Registration: Optional
- Launched: January 2013; 13 years ago
- Current status: Active

Viddsee is a video entertainment platform that drives distribution and marketing of short premium content, founded by engineer-filmmaking duo Ho Jia Jian and Derek Tan.

The company headquarters is in Blk71 in Ayer Rajah Industrial Estate in Singapore, with offices in Thailand, Malaysia and Indonesia. Its main markets are the Philippines, Malaysia, Singapore and Indonesia.

== History ==
Viddsee started as a curation platform for short films, focusing on discovery and delivery of short films that are marketed to audiences across web, mobile and app platforms.

As it grew its content library, Viddsee grew its filmmaker community through partnerships with international and regional film festivals. It focused on empowering filmmakers and bringing value back to its filmmaker community, such as through its partnership with Nikon.

Content and distribution partnerships with publishers, TV networks and distributors helped increase the visibility of the content across platforms, such as with Yahoo!, Discovery Networks, Lifetime Asia and roKKi for inflight streaming on AirAsia .

It also has a partnership with Singapore's Info-Communications Media Development Authority (IMDA) to promote Singaporean short films, with the support of the Singapore Film Commission.

It held its first offline event in 2016 in Indonesia, the Viddsee Juree Awards, to celebrate and support filmmakers and film communities in Asia. The 2017 edition was held in the Philippines.

As part of its commercialisation bid, Viddsee announced its venture into original content creation with launch of Viddsee Studios, headed by executive producer Kenny Tan.

Five original web series are slated for 2018, through a separate partnership with IMDA.

== Viddsee Originals ==
The 2018 slate of Viddsee Originals are a short film anthology, three social documentary series, a coming-of-age comedy-drama, a web series about a taxi driver and a dramatic thriller series about cyberbullying.

The ten Singaporean filmmakers in this slate of content are Ellie Ngim, Michael Tay, JD Chua, Rifyal Giffari, Sabrina Poon, Christine Seow, Ng Yiqin, Eileen Chong, Jacky Lee and Don Aravind.

== Platform ==
Viddsee is available on the web, mobile web, iOS and Android available on the Apple App Store, the Google Play Store.

== Content Partnerships ==
Viddsee has content partnerships with a growing list of film festivals, such as the Clermont-Ferrand International Short Film Festival, the Neuchâtel International Fantastic Film Festival, Cinemalaya Philippine Independent Film Festival, Women's Voices Now, Toronto Reel Asian International Film Festival, IFVA festival, China International New Media Short Film Festival, Thai Short Film and Video Festival, Kaohsiung Film Festival 高雄電影節, Golden Harvest Awards 高雄電影節, Network for the Promotion of Asian Cinema's Jogja-NETPAC Asian Film Festival, Sedicicorto International Short Film Festival, Guam International Film Festival, Luang Prabang Film Festival, Sapporo International Short Film Festival, Scream Queen Filmfest Tokyo, Youth Film Festival, Singapore Short Film Awards, YXine Film Festival, The KOMAS Freedom Film Festival, Freshwave Film Festival, and the TBS DigiCon6, among others.

It also has partnerships with film schools and film-based organisations. As of 2017, the following film schools have channels on Viddsee: Griffith Film School, The Puttnam School of Film & Animation at the LASALLE College of the Arts, the Wee Kim Wee School of Communication and Information at Nanyang Technological University, Digital & Film Department at Temasek Polytechnic, the Department of Visual Studies at Kongju National University, Film And TV Faculty at Institut_Kesenian_Jakarta Institut Kesenian Jakarta Fakultas Film dan Televisi ( FFTV ), and the Film and TV Department at Multimedia Nusantara University, among others.

It has channels from the following film-based organisations and groups: Iran: Untold Stories, The Okinawa Film Office, Our Better World, The Asian Film Archive, Singapore's National Arts Council, Hong Kong Digital Entertainment Association, and the CILECT Asia-Pacific Association (CAPA).
