= Juanita Melson =

Singaporean radio personality (1940s–2017)

- Juanita Melson in a deleted scene from Singapore GaGa (2005)
- Born: 1944–1945
- Died: 19 January 2017 (aged 72); Singapore
- Occupation: Radio personality
- Years active: 1974–2008
- Employer: Rediffusion Singapore
- Known for: Voice of MRT train and station announcements (1994–2008)
- Notable work: MRT public announcement system

Juanita Melson (1940s – 19 January 2017) was a Singaporean radio personality who voiced the MRT announcements from 1994 to 2008.

== Career ==
Melson joined Rediffusion Singapore as a part-time broadcaster in 1974. In November 1982, she began hosting the Ladies' Night programme, which aired every Wednesday evening, with Lynette Loon. Melson hosted the sixth season of the Singapore Broadcasting Corporation cooking show What's Cooking, which began airing on 15 June 1985. By then, she had become a freelance broadcaster with the station and had narrated the documentary series Gearing Up and Top of the Trade. In 1987, she submitted the Rediffusion programme Rockbox, hosted by DJ Chris Ho, to the Australian Academy of Broadcast Arts & Sciences. For this, Ho won the Most Outstanding Radio Personality in Asia-Pacific at the 1988 Pater Awards, becoming the first Singaporean to win a Pater award.

Melson was appointed Rediffusion Singapore's English Programmes Executive in February 1989. In 1991, Melson hired John Klass, who had just completed his National Service, as a DJ at Rediffusion, serving as his mentor. She introduced Klass's pop band, Kick!, to the managing director of Pony Canyon, who then signed them. She provided the voices for all MRT train and station announcements when the public announcement system was introduced in 1994. She remained the voice of the public announcement system until 2008. Her voice was also used in some local Fujitec lifts. By October 1999, she had been appointed the programme manager of Rediffusion Singapore. Melson was interviewed for the 2005 Tan Pin Pin documentary film Singapore GaGa. She is not shown physically in the film and only her voice is heard.

== Personal life and death ==
Melson was born in the 1940s. She was married with two daughters by 1968. Her husband had been posted to Hong Kong that year and the family moved there with him. However, they returned to Singapore in 1971 as her daughters wished to be educated there.

In 2013, Melson was diagnosed with lung cancer, which spread to her brain towards the end of the following year. She died of the disease on 19 January 2017. She was cremated at the crematorium at the Mandai Crematorium.
