= Toa Payoh carpark murder =

2015 murder of a waitress in Singapore

Atika Dolkifli
- Atika Dolkifli, whose body was discovered in a Toa Payoh carpark
- Born: Atika binte Dolkifli; 1992; Singapore
- Died: 31 August 2015 (aged 23); Toa Payoh, Singapore
- Cause of death: Death by a fall
- Occupation: Part-time waitress
- Employer: Pizza Hut
- Known for: Murder victim

On 3 September 2015, 23-year-old part-time waitress Atika Dolkifli was found dead at the ground level of a car park in Toa Payoh, and within less than a week, a 24-year-old man named Syed Maffi Hasan, who was a male friend of the victim, was arrested and charged with murder.

Investigations revealed that Atika was murdered by Syed Maffi on 31 August 2015, after the both of them argued over the repair costs of a mobile phone which Atika given to Syed Maffi on the top deck of the carpark, and Syed Maffi had assaulted Atika by pushing her down a flight of stairs in a fit of rage before he threw her off the fifth floor of the carpark. In May 2019, Syed Maffi was found guilty of murdering Atika and he was sentenced to life imprisonment and 12 strokes of the cane two months after his conviction.

== Background ==
Atika Dolkifli, the older of two children, was born in 1992. She worked as a part-time waitress at a Pizza Hut outlet in Toa Payoh after she reached adulthood, and Atika was diagnosed with below-average intelligence when she was 12. She first met a man named Syed Maffi Hasan and befriended him on Facebook in 2013.

Syed Maffi, the youngest of three sons, was born in Singapore in 1991. Due to the influence of one of his brothers, Syed Maffi was addicted to drugs, which led to him going to jail in 2011 and 2015 respectively. During his youth, Syed Maffi also spent two years at a juvenile's home from 2007 to 2009 for an unknown crime. During his stay there, Syed Maffi was assaulted by another person and nearly lost his eyesight as a result. Syed Maffi also worked as a cleaner and dishwasher before his second stint in prison in 2015.

In 2013, Syed Maffi befriended Atika through Facebook, but they later lost contact after Syed Maffi was detained at a drug rehabilitation centre for drug abuse. Both Atika and Syed Maffi would reconnect once again in April 2015 after the latter was released from jail.

== Murder ==
After both Atika and Syed Maffi reconnected in April 2015, Atika lent Syed Maffi her iPhone 5C as he did not own a phone at that time. After using it for some time, the phone screen had gone faulty, and Syed Maffi took it to a phone repair shop to have it fixed, and he spent S$90 as a result. Four weeks later, the phone battery became faulty and Syed Maffi had to bring it for repairs a second time, and paid another S$35. Although the repair fee in total was S$125, Syed Maffi deliberately upped it to S$300 when he sought a reimbursement sum from Atika, partly because he was unemployed and needed money at that time.

For this issue, Syed Maffi showed up several times at Atika's workplace to look for her but to no avail. On 20 August 2015, Syed Maffi went to Atika's flat and told her father Dolkifli Shariff that she owed him S$300, but her father turned him away. Atika's brother also told Syed Maffi to keep the phone and warned him to not contact his sister again.

On 31 August 2015, the date of the murder, Syed Maffi managed to get in touch with Atika and they agreed to meet up to discuss about the repair costs of the phone after Atika finished her work shift. After Atika's shift ended, she and Syed Maffi went to a multi-storey carpark in Toa Payoh, where they had sexual intercourse before they headed to the carpark's rooftop garden to talk about the phone repair costs. However, the conversation escalated into an argument between both of them. As the argument grew heated, Syed Maffi was so enraged that he pushed Atika on the chest, causing her to lose balance and fall off a flight of stairs, and hit her head on one of the steps. While Atika was in a semi-conscious state, Syed Maffi dragged her down the remaining steps, before he proceeded to throw her body over the parapet at Deck 5A of the carpark, and she landed on the third-storey of the carpark. Atika died as a result of the fall. It would be the prosecution's contention that Syed Maffi intentionally flung Atika off the parapet with the knowledge that she might die from the fall, and the resultant injuries deliberately caused were sufficient in the ordinary course of nature to cause death, even if Syed Maffi had no intention to cause death, and hence they sought to seek a conviction of murder on these grounds against Syed Maffi during his murder trial in February 2018.

After throwing Atika off the parapet, Syed Maffi gathered her belongings, took her phone and disposed of the rest, before he left the carpark, leaving Atika's body behind.

== Discovery of Atika’s body ==
Atika's father reported her missing on 1 September 2015, and when Atika's brother approached Syed Maffi to ask about his sister's whereabouts, Syed Maffi lied that he last saw her walking towards the carpark. Subsequently, when the police took him in for interrogation as a witness, Syed Maffi lied to the police that Atika had left to meet her new boyfriend on the day of the incident and she never returned to meet him.

On the morning of 3 September 2015, a passer-by discovered the decomposing body of Atika at a multi-storey carpark at Toa Payoh. Upon making the gruesome discovery, the witness called the police, which received the report at 8.17am. Paramedics were also called to the scene, and they pronounced Atika dead at the scene at 8.51am.

The police found several clumps of hair and bloodstains near the staircase linking decks 3A and 3B of the carpark, and some items, including a SIM card and a shoe were recovered by the police after a search around the carpark building, and these were among the items disposed of by Syed Maffi after the murder. On that same day, 24-year-old Syed Maffi was arrested later that evening for Atika's murder.

Although Syed Maffi maintained that he was innocent and he never killed Atika, the police still identified him through CCTV footages captured at the crime scene, and found that he entered the carpark with Atika but he left the carpark alone. After some more questioning, Syed Maffi finally confessed to the murder.

On 5 September 2015, two days after the discovery of Atika's body, Syed Maffi Hasan was charged with murder. During that week itself, there were a total of three murders, including the murder of Atika, that occurred in a span of five days, and while Singapore was revelled with shock over the recent spate of brutal killings, ex-policemen noted that such an occurrence was rare. If he was found guilty of murder under Singaporean law, Syed Maffi would potentially be sentenced to death.

On the same date when Syed Maffi was charged, a funeral was held for Atika before she was buried at Choa Chu Kang Muslim Cemetery. More than 30 people, including Atika's friends, family and former teachers, were present at the funeral. Atika's 61-year-old father (who was a retiree) described her as a happy-go-lucky person who was close to her relatives and he thanked everyone who came to his daughter's funeral, and he added that he never knew her alleged killer, even though Atika and Syed Maffi were friends.

== Trial of Syed Maffi Hasan ==
Syed Maffi Hasan
- Born: Syed Maffi bin Hasan; 1991 (age 34–35); Singapore
- Occupation: Unemployed
- Status: Imprisoned at Changi Prison since September 2015
- Conviction: Murder under Section 300(b) of the Penal Code (one count)
- Criminal charge: Murder under Section 300(b) of the Penal Code (one count)
- Penalty: Life imprisonment and 12 strokes of the cane

On 20 February 2018, Syed Maffi Hasan officially stood trial at the High Court for one count of murdering Atika Dolkifli. The prosecution was led by Deputy Public Prosecutors Bhajanvir Singh and Quek Jing Feng, while Syed Maffi was represented by Kalidass Murugaiyan, Rajan Supramaniam and Sujatha Selvakumar. The trial was presided by Justice Aedit Abdullah of the High Court. During the trial itself, Syed Maffi challenged the admissibility of his confession, and also gave his defence. Aside from this, an autopsy report was submitted to the court, revealing that as a result of the fall, Atika sustained multiple fractures and serious lacerations on her scalp and face, and she died as a result of a head injury caused by the fall. A government psychiatrist also testified that Syed Maffi did not suffer from any abnormality of the mind at the time of the murder.

In January 2019, it was reported that Syed Maffi discharged his legal counsel on the grounds that they insisted on making him stand trial even though he was unwell. A psychiatric report had earlier assessed that Syed Maffi was fit to plead and stand trial. Although the trial judge Aedit Abdullah expressed his concern about the manner Syed Maffi took to apply for the discharge, the discharge was nevertheless granted and Syed Maffi was subsequently represented by another legal counsel in court.

On 21 May 2019, in the middle of his trial, Syed Maffi chose to not rebut the murder charge and pleaded guilty to the murder charge. Therefore, in view of Syed Maffi's decision, he was formally found guilty of murder by intentionally causing a bodily injury that was likely to cause death under Section 300(b) of the Penal Code. After his conviction, Syed Maffi's sentencing trial was postponed for the prosecution and defence to provide closing arguments on sentence. For a Section 300(b) murder offence, Syed Maffi would be given either the death penalty or life imprisonment with caning.

The prosecution did not argue for the death penalty during their submissions on sentence. Instead, they sought a life sentence and caning of at least 12 strokes, and stated that even after pushing Atika down the stairs and having harmed her, Syed Maffi chose to inflict further harm on Atika and in turn caused her death, and he himself also kept mum about her death when he was first asked by her brother, and such conduct demonstrated his intent to cause harm that would likely lead to Atika's death, as well as his lack of remorse for the murder. On the other hand, Syed Maffi's lawyer Kishan Pratap did not object to life imprisonment but they asked for the least number of strokes of the cane as the death of Atika was a result of Syed Maffi acting impulsively during the argument and Syed Maffi also regretted his actions and wanted to apologize to the victim's family.

On 4 July 2019, 28-year-old Syed Maffi Hasan was sentenced to life imprisonment and 12 strokes of the cane. In his oral sentencing remarks, Justice Abdullah stated that generally, in cases where death is caused, it is legally bound for the courts to impose not less than 12 strokes of the cane, and he saw no reason to deviate from this sentencing region, and therefore he awarded Syed Maffi a life term with 12 strokes of the cane.

Syed Maffi did not appeal his sentence, and he is currently serving his life sentence at Changi Prison since the end of his trial.

== See also ==
- Caning in Singapore
- Life imprisonment in Singapore
- Capital punishment in Singapore
- List of major crimes in Singapore
