= Curriculum Development Institute of Singapore =

Educational media company

The Curriculum Development Institute of Singapore (CDIS) was established in 1980 by the Ministry of Education to distribute audiovisual material to Singaporean schools. In the 1980s, it absorbed the ministry's ETV programmes on television.

== History ==
CDIS was announced on 17 March 1980, using the same venue as the Institute of Education (IE) and the Singapore Educational Media Service (SEMS). CDIS provided curriculum packages to the aforementioned entities and would soon provide its programmes to SBC's channels, where there was the ETV programming block. Set for a June launch, on 26 March, Wang Mong Lin was appointed as its first director.

CDIS started functioning on 1 June 1980, from a provisional facility at the Kent Ridge campus' Arts and Social Services building. SEMS became its education technology arm, while DET (Division for Educational Technology) produced audiovisual materials. The decision implied the sclaing down of DET's ETV programmes, three of which were suspended. During its first month of operations, it produced its first three cassettes, Chinese language tapes for primary one teachers and students. By August, it had no less than thirteen projects, one of them being a teaching aid to correct common English mistakes. It was expected that, by year-end 1980, it would finish course materials for mathematics and language classes in English, Malay, Mandarin and Tamil for monolingual teachers.

In November 1980, it announced that all Chinese names would begin following the Pinyin romanisation system.

In February 1981, CDIS appointed foreign consultants for most of its seventeen projects. Late next month, CDIS staff flew to Japan for video training, with the goal of commencing videotaped productions to schools. On 28 July, its production Hanyu Pinyin Without Tears started broadcasting on television. The goal was to properly pronounce names in the newly adopted Pinyin system to non-Chinese and parents of Chinese children. These aired on the educational television slot on Channel 8.

A recommendation by the Department for Educational Technology for aspiring film students to use the CDIS studios for television production was passed on 6 February 1982, with the National Junior College and Temasek Junior College asking for cameras. ETV programmes were expected to be in colour in 1983; the transition would be complete by 1984. In July, CDIS allows games such as chess and Mastermind in computer appreciation clubs. On 19 July, SBC started airing colour programmes for Primary Three students. In August, it was revealed that there was a "tentative conceptual" plan to publish a four-page monthly newspaper for children.

In early 1983, the Prime Minister ordered CDIS a ten-part television series on Singapore's history from 1942 to 1978. By early March, seven of the ten episodes were completed. It was set to air between May and August. The documentary series Making of a Nation first aired on 5 June 1983.

CDIS received praise from Dr. Tan Cheng Bock, chairman of the Government Parliamentary Committee on Education, for the continued improvement of the quality of its textbooks. In 1989, it aimed the creation of a separate adult education channel. At the time, all CDIS programmes aired on SBC 8.
