= St James Power Station murder =

2017 killing of a man at St James Power Station, Singapore

- Date: 12 March 2017; 9 years ago
- Location: St James Power Station, Singapore
- Motive: Allegedly out of revenge for earlier dispute
- Deaths: Satheesh Kumar Manogaran
- Suspects: Muhammad Hisham bin Hassan, 27; Muhd Firdaus bin Abdullah, 19; Shawalludin bin Sa'adon, 26; Muhammad Faizal bin Md Jamal, 22; Muhammad Khalid bin Kamarudin, 21

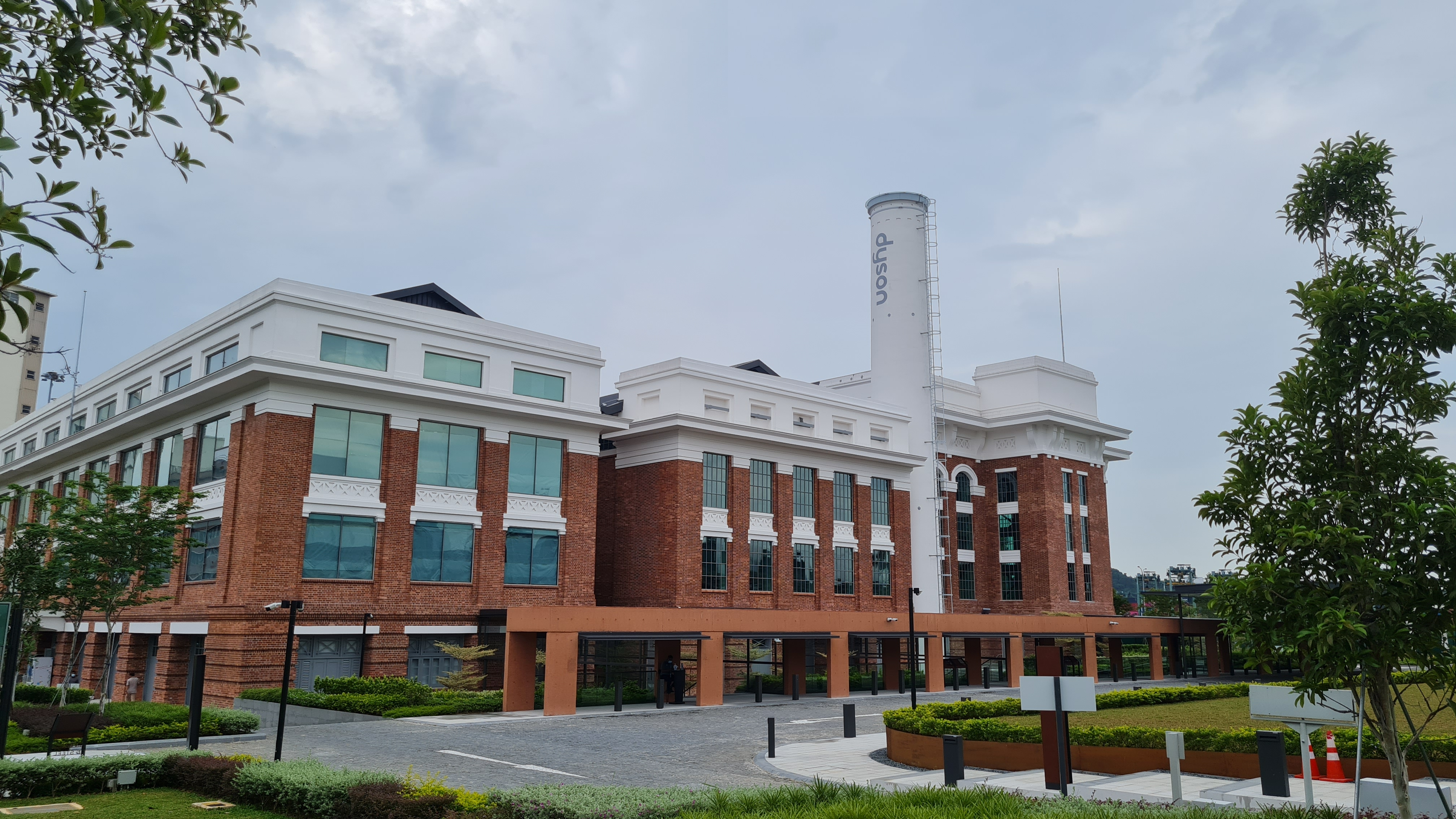
St James Power Station, where the murder took place

On 12 March 2017, two men aged 28 and 34 were attacked by a group of three assailants outside a pub at St James Power Station. The two men, who were both cousins, were severely injured and rushed to hospital. But the older victim, Satheesh Kumar Manogaran, died as a result of several stab wounds to his head and back. On the other hand, the younger victim, who was Satheesh's cousin, survived his wounds.

The three attackers, as well as two other people who harboured them, were arrested and charged with various offences of murder and harbouring a murder suspect. Subsequently, only one of the assailants, Muhammad Khalid Kamarudin, remained facing a murder charge, while the remaining four suspects were convicted and jailed for lesser offences of harbouring a murder suspect and causing grievous hurt (not excluding the unrelated offences these four committed). As of 2024, the outcome of Khalid's trial for murder is not known.

== Assault and death ==
Satheesh Kumar Manogaran, the man murdered at St James Power Station

At about 4.30am on 12 March 2017, inside a pub at St James Power Station, one of the pub's waiters Shawalludin Sa’adon, who was 26 years old at that time, had an argument with two customers over a liquor bottle which was misplaced by the duo, who were accompanied by a few more friends. As the quarrel grew more tense, Shawalludin was told by his supervisors to step outside in their bid to defuse the situation.

Feeling aggrieved and incensed over the dispute, Shawalludin, who had connections to an unlawful secret society, contacted his friends, who were his friends from Sio Koon Tong, the gang which Shawalludin was affiliated with. Shawalludin asked them to help him settle scores with the two men who argued with him earlier.

After the phone call was made, three of Shawalludin's friends - 27-year-old Muhammad Hisham bin Hassan, 22-year-old Muhammad Faizal bin Md Jamal and 21-year-old Muhammad Khalid bin Kamarudin - arrived and met up with Shawalludin, who pointed out the two men who quarreled with him earlier on.

Khalid was reportedly the first to attack the two men, using a knife to stab one of the victims several times before he set upon the other victim. Afterwards, Shawalludin and Faizal joined in the assault, kicking and punching the men despite they were being stabbed. Khalid also kicked and punched the two men after he stopped stabbing the men. Hisham did not partake in the stabbing or assault as he was calling his girlfriend, but he agreed with the trio to hurt the two men. The incident was witnessed by a large crowd.

One of the men, 34-year-old Satheesh Kumar Manogaran, died as a result of the fatal knife wounds on his head and back. The other victim was 28-year-old Naveen Lal Pillar, who was Satheesh's younger cousin. Naveen, who was also grievously hurt during the attack, survived with timely medical intervention.

According to Satheesh's family (who all rushed back from Malaysia to identify his body), he was a dutiful son who took care of his parents after his two younger siblings got married and moved out, and he just managed to get a new job through an interview the week before his death. His remains were cremated at Mandai Crematorium after a funeral on 15 March 2017. Satheesh was previously convicted of rioting in a 2007 murder case, where 35-year-old Lim Chye Huat was murdered by a group of 13 men; Satheesh was sentenced to 36 months' jail and three strokes of the cane for the crime. Another 11 of the offenders were similarly dealt with by the law, but the final suspect, Muhammad Ridzuan Johan, who was wanted for murder and listed on the Interpol red notice list, remains at large as of today.

The murder case was highly reported in the media and it highlighted the phenomenon of the frequent occurrence of fights at St James Power Station, and some members of the public were concerned with the security issues of the location.

== Criminal charges ==
Soon after the fatal attack, Shawalludin returned to his workplace and continued working after he cleaned his hands. The police, who were alerted to the attack, arrested Shawalludin at the pub itself after their arrival. They also classified the death of Satheesh as murder and investigations began swiftly to apprehend the other offenders.

Meanwhile, after the incident, Khalid, Hashim and Faizal left St James Power Station and together, they seek help from a 19-year-old member of their gang. Hisham instructed the 19-year-old, identified as Muhd Firdaus Abdullah, to bring both Khalid and Faizal to his godmother's flat in Yishun where Hisham and Firdaus harboured Khalid and Faizal, although Faizal would leave after spending one hour at the flat.

31 hours after the murder, the police conducted a raid and arrested Hisham, Khalid and Firdaus after they got wind of their whereabouts, and they became the second, third and fourth to be caught for the killing. As for Faizal, he went to seek refuge at the homes of some other acquaintances, and after hiding at four flats, Faizal was finally arrested 63 hours after he assaulted both Satheesh and Naveen. He was the fifth and final suspect to be arrested for the murder.

On 14 March 2017, two days after he was caught, Shawalludin was charged with one count of murder in relation to his involvement in Satheesh's killing. If convicted of murder, Shawalludin could receive a death sentence in Singapore. Prior to his involvement in the case of Satheesh's death, Shawalludin was previously convicted and jailed for theft in 2016 and had also served a sentence at a drug rehabilitation center for consumption of morphine.

Similarly, Khalid and Hisham were both charged with murder a day after Shawalludin was indicted in court. On 16 March 2017, Faizal became the fourth man to be charged with murder after he was caught.

Firdaus, who was serving his full-time National Service as a policeman, was charged with harbouring his fellow gang members with the knowledge that they committed murder. Firdaus, who was later released on bail, re-offended by trafficking, consuming and possessing drugs, and even deserted from his NS duties for about 141 days, and he was eventually caught and charged for these fresh offences.

== Sentences of the first four accused ==
Subsequently, after further investigations and court appearances, the murder charges against Hisham, Faizal and Shawalludin were reduced to lesser offences that did not carry the death penalty.

On 2 January 2018, Hisham was convicted of abetting the trio cause injury to Satheesh and Naveen, and another charge of harbouring two of the suspects Faizal and Khalid. His aggregate sentence for these two charges was 18 months' imprisonment.

On 30 May 2018, 20-year-old Firdaus was found guilty of harbouring Khalid and Faizal. He was also charged with failing to report for his NS duties, being a gang member and trafficking, consumption and possession of drugs, for which he was convicted for in the same court hearing. For these above charges, Firdaus was jailed for six years and two months and also received five strokes of the cane.

On 11 September 2018, Shawalludin became the third accused to stand trial for one charge of inflicting grievous harm to Satheesh. He pleaded guilty and was scheduled to return to court for his mitigation plea and sentencing on 8 October 2018. He faced a potential sentence of up to ten years in prison, in addition to caning or a fine.

On 26 November 2018, 28-year-old Shawalludin was sentenced to five years and six months' jail and six strokes of the cane.

On 14 May 2019, Faizal, then aged 24, was found guilty of one count of voluntarily causing grievous hurt to Satheesh and another charge of causing hurt to Naveen. He was sentenced to eight years and six months' jail and eight strokes of the cane.

== Murder trial of Khalid ==
The final suspect Muhammad Khalid Kamarudin was the sole person left pending trial for murder. If convicted, he would be sentenced to death or life in prison.

It was reported that Khalid would stand trial in July 2019 for one count of murdering Satheesh. However, there was no reports related to the trial, possibly indicating that it did not take place or that his trial was conducted without access from the media.

As of 2024, the outcome of Khalid's case was not known.

== See also ==
- Caning in Singapore
- 2019 Orchard Towers murder
- List of major crimes in Singapore
- Capital punishment in Singapore
