= Teck Whye Crescent murder =

2017 fatal stabbing case in Singapore

Mohammad Roslan Zaini
- Mohammad Roslan Zaini, the 35-year-old victim
- Born: Mohammad Roslan bin Zaini c. 1982; Singapore
- Died: 16 August 2017 (aged 35); Teck Whye, Choa Chu Kang, Singapore
- Cause of death: Fatal knife wound to the heart
- Known for: Murder victim
- Spouse: Unnamed ex-wife
- Children: 1 son

On 16 August 2017, during a heated argument, 48-year-old Mohammad Rosli Abdul Rahim picked up a kitchen knife and stabbed his 35-year-old flatmate Mohammad Roslan Zaini in the heart at their rented Teck Whye flat, which caused Roslan to bleed to death while staggering to an open area outside the flat. Rosli was charged with murder, and despite claiming he was gravely provoked and lost control while killing Roslan (who allegedly insulted Rosli's mother), the trial court found him capable of self control at the time of the crime and hence found Rosli guilty of murder. After the prosecution declined to seek the death penalty, Rosli was sentenced to life in prison in January 2022.

== Fatal stabbing of Roslan ==
=== Roslan's death ===
On the morning of 16 August 2017, inside a rented flat at Teck Whye Crescent, a man was stabbed on the chest and he died shortly after staggering out of the flat and collapsed on a grass patch at the foot of his block. Residents were shocked at the incident, and some also state they heard sounds of a commotion coming from the flat where the victim was fatally stabbed.

The corpse of the victim, identified as 35-year-old Mohammad Roslan Zaini, was first discovered by a bus driver at the grass field itself. Subsequently, paramedics responded to a report about Roslan and they pronounced Roslan dead at the scene. The police responded to the report of Roslan's death and they conducted their first round of investigations, and they followed a trail of blood to Roslan's flat on the fourth floor of his block, where they searched for evidence while cordoning the flat.

It was on that same day, when the police managed to establish the identity of the suspect and arrested the man, who was Roslan's flatmate and was seen at a nearby housing estate when the police traced his whereabouts and approached him. It was also revealed through preliminary investigations that Roslan and the flatmate was allegedly having a dispute with one another and it led to the suspect stabbing Roslan several times and caused Roslan's death, which had been classified as murder by the police.

=== Murder charge ===
On 18 August 2017, two days after Roslan's murder, his 48-year-old flatmate Mohammad Rosli Abdul Rahim was charged in court with murder. Rosli himself was also brought back to the crime scene three days after he was charged, and would re-enact how he committed the crime itself. Under Singaporean law, if Rosli was found guilty of murder, he would face the death penalty.

One of Roslan's neighbours, a 49-year-old warehouse assistant, stated that Rosli used to sleep at the third-storey staircase landing of the block for the previous two years before November 2016, when Roslan invited Rosli to live with him and Roslan told the neighbour that he was sympathetic towards Rosli. Another neighbour of Roslan, who worked in the logistics sector, told the press that Roslan used to live in the flat with his ex-wife and baby son before the couple divorced and Roslan was left living alone in the flat after his son and ex-wife moved out. A third neighbour described Roslan as a friendly person and also stated Rosli was polite to his neighbours and would apologize each time for the noises often heard regularly at the flat. At the time of his death, Roslan's mother was deceased, and his twin brother was living in another part of Singapore.

== Background of Rosli ==
Mohammad Rosli Abdul Rahim
- Born: Mohammad Rosli bin Abdul Rahim; 1969 (age 56–57); Singapore
- Other name: Trojan
- Occupation: Unemployed
- Spouse: Unnamed ex-wife
- Children: 2
- Status: Imprisoned at Changi Prison since August 2017
- Conviction: Murder under Section 300(c) of the Penal Code (one count)
- Criminal charge: Murder under Section 300(c) of the Penal Code (one count)
- Penalty: Life imprisonment

Mohammad Rosli Abdul Rahim was born in Singapore in 1969. According to his lawyers, Rosli had an unhappy childhood because his mother had physically and emotionally abused him until he became a teenager. When Rosli was 13, he discovered his mother having affairs with other men and informed his father, which led to his parents' divorce. Even so, Rosli still craved for his mother's love, and eventually, Rosli reconnected with her in the later years, and he dutifully provided her allowance and also paid for her medical expenses. Rosli's mother died while her son was in remand for the murder offence. It was also reported that Rosli married at the age of 21 and had two children, but his marriage lasted only three years and it ended with a divorce due to his drug addiction.

According to a female friend, in spite of his previous run-ins with the law, Rosli was a good-hearted person who treated his friends well, and he also would provide them advice whenever they faced any difficulties. The friend however, noted that Rosli had a bad temper, and this led to him getting into trouble on several occasions, including a knife-wielding incident that took place at a coffee shop several months before the murder. By November 2016, Rosli was homeless for two years and slept on the corridors of HDB blocks, and it was then he first met his tenant Mohammad Roslan Zaini, who took pity on Rosli and offered to let him live in his rented flat at Teck Whye Crescent. The two men had a good and friendly relationship, and they also split the monthly rent.

== Rosli's murder trial ==
=== Cases of the prosecution and defence ===
On 16 February 2021, 51-year-old Mohammad Rosli Abdul Rahim stood trial at the High Court for one count of murder. Rosli was represented by Anand Nalachandran, Low Chun Yee and Adeline Goh, while the prosecution was led by Yang Ziliang, Andre Chong and Zhou Yang. The trial was presided by Justice Dedar Singh Gill of the High Court.

The trial court was told that in August 2017, the same month of the killing, Rosli began to suspect that Roslan was overcharging his share of rent and their daily expenses, and Roslan himself allegedly did not pay up his share of rent, and they frequently quarrelled over this. Additionally, a female friend of Rosli, whom he knew for over ten years and treated like a sister, had broken up with Roslan and she complained to Rosli about Roslan, and it further added conflict to his relationship with Roslan. On the early hours of 16 August 2017, the date of the murder, Rosli, Roslan and their three friends (one of whom left early before the killing) were at the rented flat watching a movie. Roslan and Rosli were once again arguing over money during that movie session itself, and angered by Roslan's remarks, Rosli rushed into the kitchen and picked up a knife with a 17 cm-long blade. Afterwards, Rosli used the knife to stab Roslan in the chest, right forearm and right thigh, and it was witnessed by the two visitors, who all were shocked at the stabbing. According to Dr Gilbert Lau, the forensic pathologist who examined Roslan's corpse, the knife wound inflicted on his chest penetrated his heart, and it was sufficient in the ordinary course of nature to cause death.

In his defence, Rosli stated he never intended to kill Roslan, and thus raised the defences of diminished responsibility, sudden and grave provocation and accidental stabbing. He alleged that during the argument between Roslan and himsey, Roslan had insulted Rosli's mother and this caused to be enraged and lost his self-control, and he was therefore provoked into stabbing Roslan to death. Rosli stated while he had plunged the knife into Roslan's chest, he never intended to cause his death as the knife was accidentally "poked" into Roslan's chest while he was slashing the knife towards Roslan. Rosli also claimed he had consumed nitrazepam, a sedative, around the time of the offence. Dr G. Kandasami, a government psychiatrist, testified that Rosli had some degree of "cognition and volitional impairment" under a high dose of nitrazepam, but he stated it was not sufficient to impair his mental responsibility at the time of the murder.

=== Verdict and conviction ===
On 9 November 2021, Justice Dedar Singh Gill delivered his verdict. He rejected Rosli's defence of accidental stabbing, as he accepted the forensic evidence and eyewitness testimony that Rosli had inflicted the wound by an inward thrust, and found it too incredible to buy Rosli's claim of accidentally poking the knife at Roslan's chest with the knife. Justice Gill also found that there was adequate lighting in the room, and Rosli had chosen the most "lethal implement" in the kitchen tray, and it corroborated the fact that he had intentionally inflicted the fatal stab wound. Justice Gill also found that Rosli's consumption of sedatives was not sufficient to impair Rosli's state of mind at the time he murdered Roslan. He further noted that Roslan's alleged insults hurled at Rosli's mother did not sufficiently constitute a form of sudden and grave provocation that could made Rosli enraged and lost his self-control when he stabbed Roslan to death, since such remarks are common and a reasonable person who heard it would not react with such lethal violence.

Therefore, Mohammad Rosli Abdul Rahim was found guilty of murder under Section 300(c) of the Penal Code. Sentencing was adjourned to a later date to give both the prosecution and defence time to file submissions on sentence. The prosecution expressed that they would not seek the death penalty. A murder charge under Section 300(c) of the Penal Code was punishable by either death or life in prison with caning.

=== Sentencing ===
On 13 January 2022, 52-year-old Mohammad Rosli Abdul Rahim was sentenced to life imprisonment. Prior to his sentencing, Rosli's defence counsel submitted a mitigation plea that a life sentence was appropriate in Rosli's case, as the circumstances of the case and his conduct did not warrant the death penalty, and added that the prosecution had earlier announced their intention to not request for capital punishment. Apart from his life term, Rosli did not get caning as he was above the age of 50 at the time of sentencing.

It was also reported that Rosli's defence counsel was replaced by prominent criminal lawyer Eugene Thuraisingam and his two associates Chooi Jing Yen and Hamza Zafar Malik, after Rosli's previous defence counsel discharged themselves before his sentencing. Thuraisingam expressed that Rosli would appeal against his conviction and sentence.

Though it went unreported, Rosli's appeal against his conviction and sentence was dismissed by the Court of Appeal on 30 June 2022.

In the aftermath of Rosli's trial, his case was brought to public attention once again when in March 2023, 59-year-old Ng Boon Hong was arrested at Redhill Close for allegedly murdering his 61-year-old flatmate Ang Cheng Kek inside their rented flat, and both the cases of Ng and Rosli were among the previous cases of co-tenant violence in rental flats discussed by netizens who all questioned the government policy of arranging for strangers to live together in co-rental flats, given that there were cases of tenants having conflicts with each other over certain issues under the same roof and led to these cases of violence committed within rental flats.

== See also ==
- Life imprisonment in Singapore
- List of major crimes in Singapore
