= Singapore International School =

Coordinates: 22°14′40″N 114°10′2″E

Singapore International School (Hong Kong) (新加坡国际学校（香港）) (新加坡國際學校（香港）)

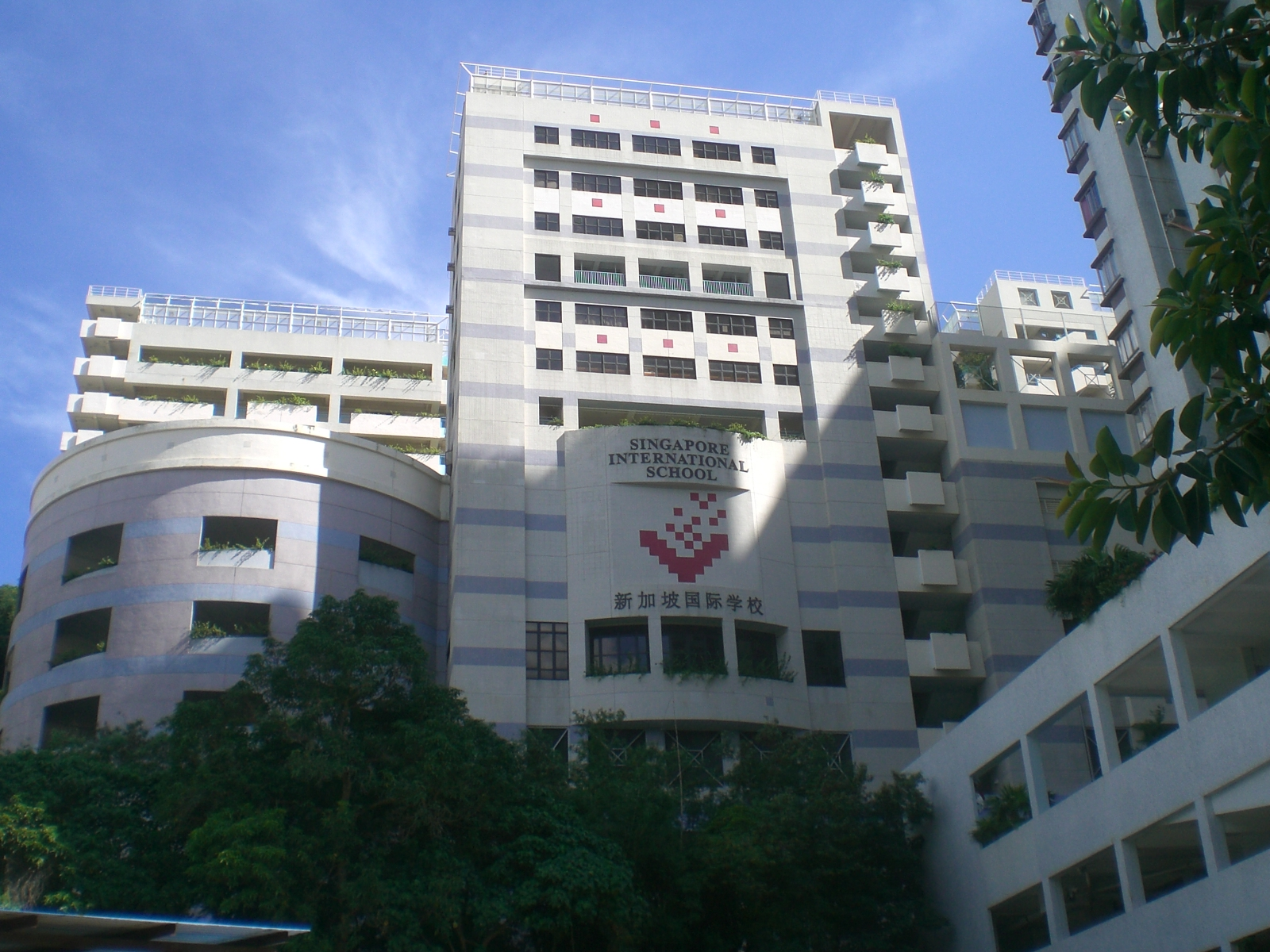

Location
- 23 Nam Long Shan Road, Aberdeen (Primary campus); 2 Police School Road, Aberdeen (Secondary campus); Hong Kong (22.2448206, 114.1679340)

Information
- Type: International, co-educational
- Motto: Success Inspires Success
- Established: 1991
- School district: Aberdeen
- Principal: Tony Low
- Staff: Staff List
- Grades: Kindergarten to Secondary and pre-university IB diploma
- Enrollment: approx. 1,500
- Colours: Red, white, black, grey
- Website: Official website

Singapore International School
- Traditional Chinese: 新加坡國際學校（香港）
- Simplified Chinese: 新加坡国际学校（香港）
Transcriptions
Standard Mandarin
- Hanyu Pinyin: Xīnjiāpō Guójì Xuéxiào
Yue: Cantonese
- Jyutping: san1 gaa1*3 bo1 gwok3 zai3 hok6 haau6

Singapore International School (Hong Kong) (SISHK) is a kindergarten, elementary and secondary (up to Form Four, offers Cambridge IGCSE and International Baccalaureate Diploma Programme) school situated in two different campuses on Nam Long Shan Road, Hong Kong Island.

It is an international school set up by the Ministry of Education (MOE) of Singapore and follows the Singaporean curriculum. The school was established in September 1991 in Kennedy Town with an enrollment of 200 students. This number has risen above the 1500 students mark, from a variety of nationalities, with the majority being Hong Kongers and Singaporeans.

== History ==
In 1995, SISHK moved to its current premises on Nam Long Shan road near Aberdeen, occupying an area of 4,150 square meters. The land was granted by the Hong Kong Government while the cost of the building was borne by the Singapore government.

An extension was carried out in 2002 to build new facilities and make the school taller.

The secondary school section was established in 2007 and used the premises of the former Wanchai School. It officially accepted students in 2009. The Wanchai premises had the basic features of a secondary school, such as an IGCSE-certified Science laboratory, an air-conditioned auditorium, two art studios, two music studios, one dance studio and a fitness room. The pupils used the Morrison Hill swimming pool, Queen Elizabeth Stadium and Happy Valley Recreation Ground, all within 10 minutes of walking time.

Between 2009 and 2012, SISHK became an authorized member of Cambridge IGCSE.

In Jun 2011, SISHK's secondary school section moved to their new secondary school campus at Police School Road, the former site of Shue Yan Secondary School.

The preparatory and primary upgrading project started in 2013.

In 2019, the school went through another upgrade to make the school more modern, this ended in 2022.

== Curriculum ==
In 1994, Mandarin courses were offered twice daily per school schedule at the primary school level. Currently, English, Math and Chinese are taught every day in Primary school. Every day, students will have recess time, which lasts for 25 minutes.(With 5 minutes to get back to student’s respective classrooms) Lunch also has 30 minutes. Science is only taught from P3 onwards and is taught 3 times a week. Other than the subjects mentioned above, the school also offers drama, dance, physical education, swimming, art, social studies and I&D.

== Facilities ==
SISHK has 47 classrooms in the PYP section and 20 secondary classrooms. The canteen is operated by Sodexo. There is also a library, a plaza, a gym, an auditorium, a swimming pool, a basketball court, a playground, science labs, offices for teachers and a rooftop garden.

The SISHK Primary Section Campus

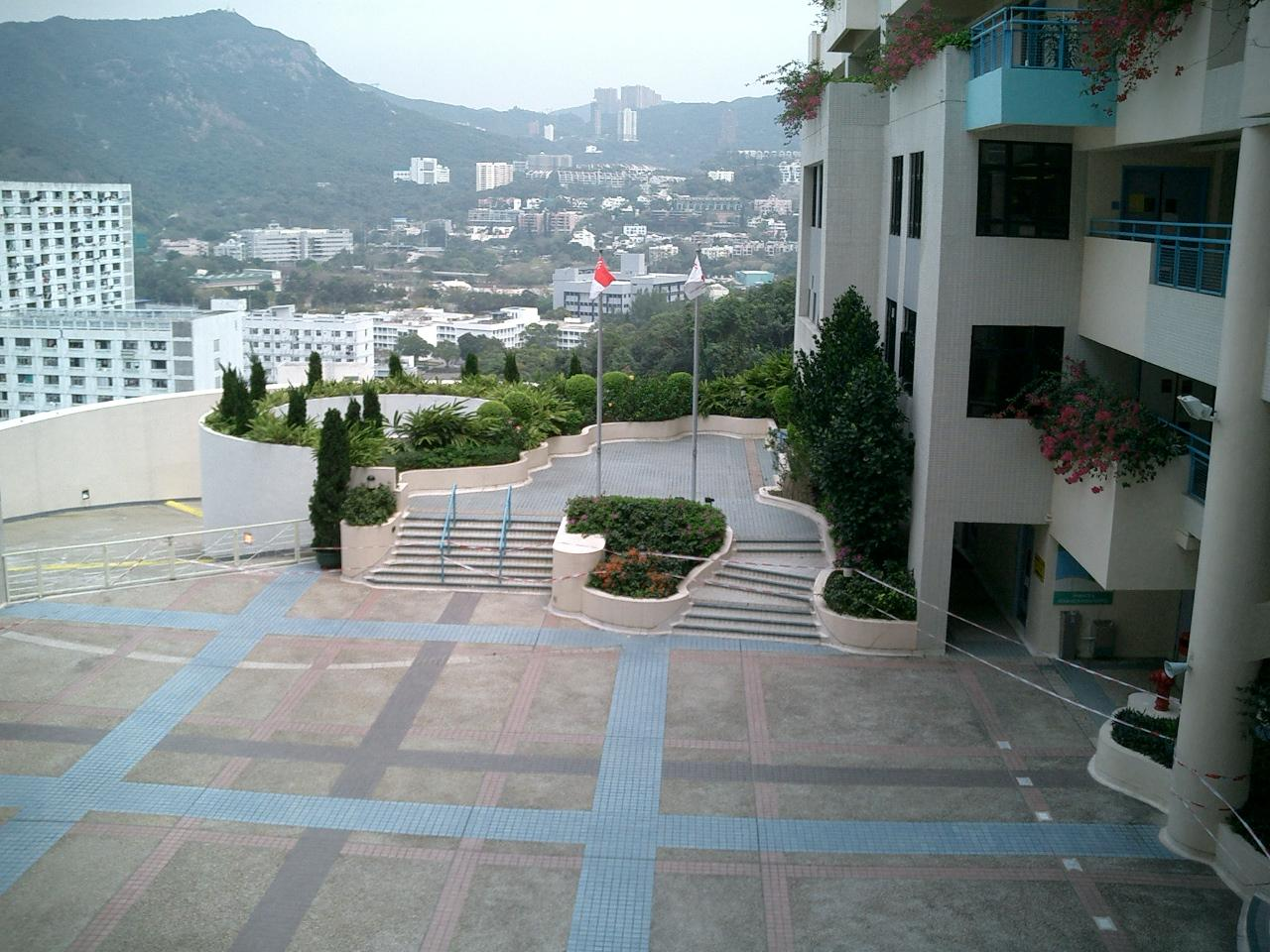
Primary Campus Plaza

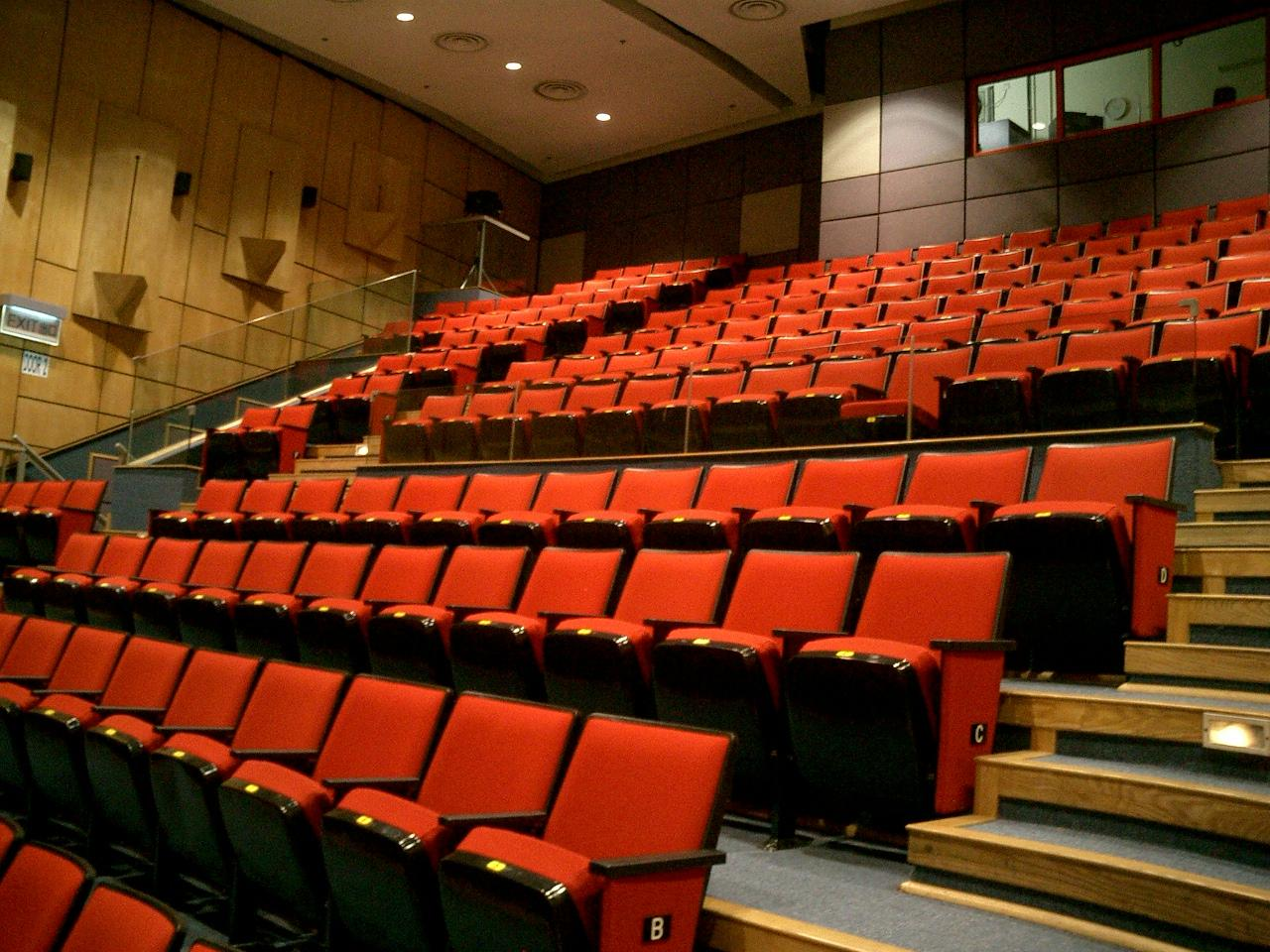
Primary Campus Auditorium

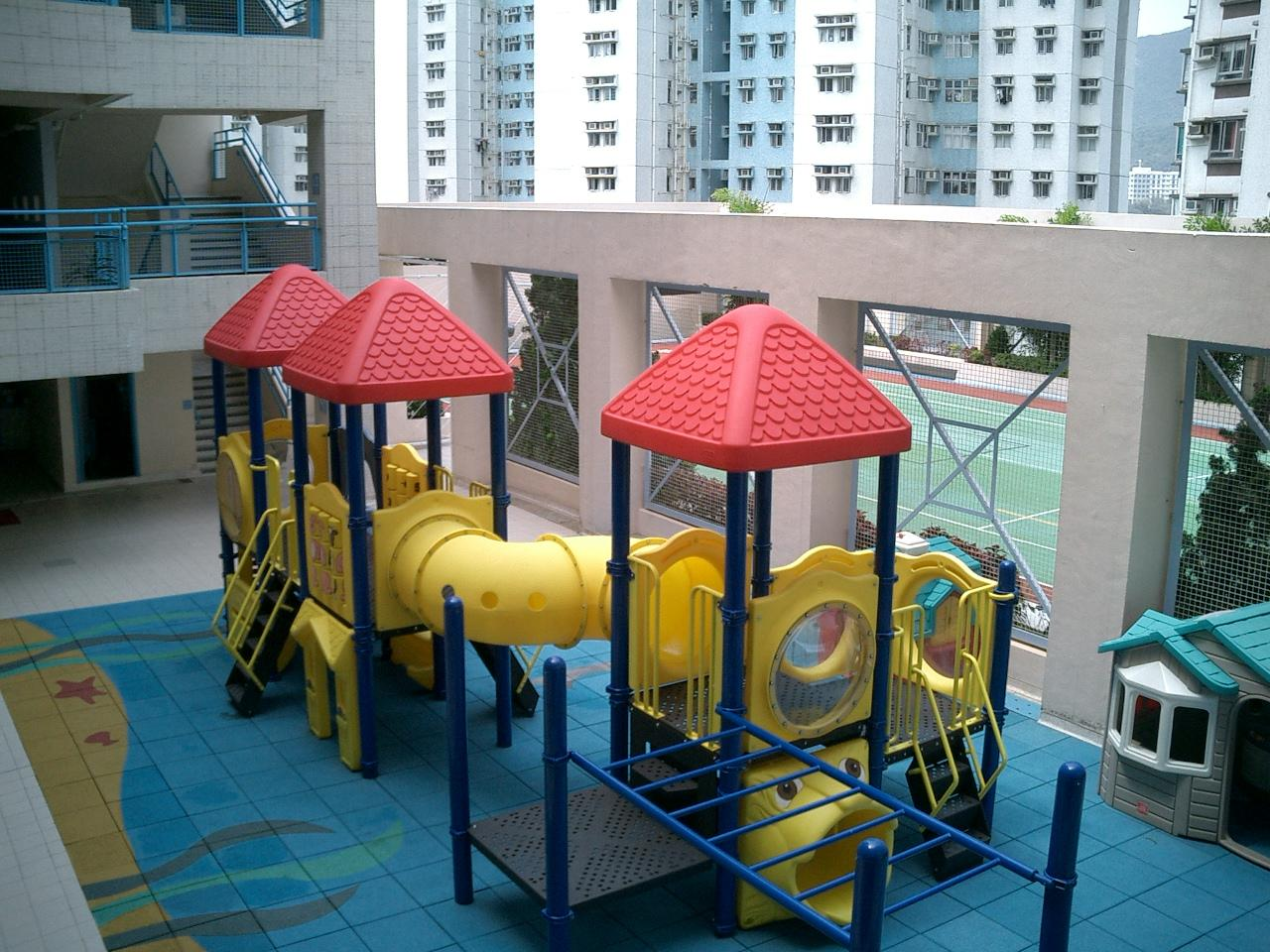
Preparatory Year playground
