= Magnus Böcker =

Swedish businessman (1961–2017)

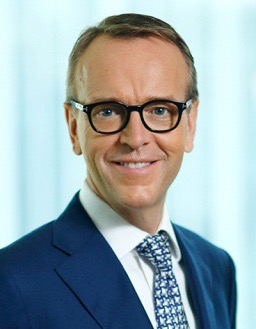
- Born: 30 August 1961; Sköllersta, Örebro, Sweden
- Died: 26 July 2017 (aged 55); St. Louis, Missouri, US
- Education: Stockholm University
- Occupation: CEO of Singapore Exchange President of NASDAQ Executive chairman of Blibros Capital Partners
- Board member of: Shanghai International Financial Advisory Council; CSM Sport and Entertainment Global Advisory Board; Singapore Management University; Bandra Kurla Complex

Magnus Böcker (31 August 1961 – 26 July 2017) was a Swedish businessman. He was the CEO of the Singapore Exchange (SGX), the President of Nasdaq, and the CEO of OMX. He was also the founder and Executive Chairman of Blibros Capital Partners, an investment company based in Singapore and Stockholm, and the chairman and co-founder of Tryb.

== Professional career ==
=== SGX and OMX ===
Böcker was the CEO of the Singapore Exchange (SGX) from 1 December 2009 to 30 June 2015 He previously was the president of Nasdaq from 2008 to 2009. He played a large role in the creation of OMX, the Nordic exchange and technology group, and the eventual merger of OMX and Nasdaq in 2008, after being the CEO of OMX from 2003 to 2008. He worked in various capacities, including CFO, COO and president of the OMX Technology division before he became CEO of OMX in 2003.

=== Leadership roles ===
Böcker held many past appointments, including chairman of the board at Orc Group AB, Chairman of Dustin AB, Chairman of the Diversity Action Committee Singapore, and board member of the World Federation of Exchanges, the Mount Sinai Surgery Advisory Board in New York, and Council Member of the Institute of Banking and Finance in Singapore.

=== Advisory roles ===
Böcker was a Member of the CSM Sport and Entertainment Global Advisory Board, the Shanghai International Financial Advisory Council, the Sim Kee Boon Institute for Financial Economics at Singapore Management University, and the Bandra Kurla Complex International Financial Services Centre in Mumbai.

Böcker also held several advisory roles in the financial market – he was Senior Advisor to Bain Inc. in relation to Financial Services (including Financial Markets, Exchanges and Fintec), and Advisor to Permira in Asia.
