= Harnoko Dewantoro =

Paroled Indonesian serial killer

- Born: November 3, 1964 (age 61); Indonesia
- Other name: "Oki"
- Conviction: Murder (3 counts)
- Penalty: Death; commuted and released

Details
- Victims: 3
- Span of crimes: 1991–1992
- Country: United States
- State: California
- Date apprehended: January 1995

Harnoko "Oki" Dewantoro (November 3, 1964) is an Indonesian serial killer who killed three people in Los Angeles, California, between 1991 and 1992. Despite committing the crimes on the territory of the United States, he was convicted of all three murders by an Indonesian court and sentenced to death, but paroled in 2019 following a clemency from President Joko Widodo.

== Biography ==
Born on November 3, 1964, as the son of a prominent Indonesian banking family, Dewantoro and his girlfriend came to the United States on student visas in the late 1980s, initially settling in Kansas, where he attended school. After graduating, Dewantoro briefly moved to Pennsylvania before arriving in Los Angeles. The pair lived in various areas of the city, including North Hills, Northridge and Westwood, as well as nearby Lake Forest.

In January 1991, Dewantoro, who by this time was operating a dry-cleaning business, sold the venture to 40-year-old Indian businessman Suresh Gobid Mirchandini for $100,000. Much to the former's dismay, however, Mirchandini abandoned it seven months later, while still owing thousand of dollars to Dewantoro. Angered, he decided to get revenge on him, and his son, in August, he lured Mirchandini to his car and went for a drive along one of the city's freeways. Along the way, Dewantoro pulled out a revolver and killed Mirchandini. He then drove to a rented home he owned in Northridge, where he subsequently buried the body.

In the spring of 1992, after he had a falling-off with his wealthy girlfriend, Dewantoro began soliciting an associate of his, 28-year-old Indonesian student Gina Sutan Aswar, to move to Los Angeles and invest in his business. Aswar accepted, and shortly thereafter travelled to the USA under the premise of investing $200,000. However, on November 3, 1992, after returning from a vacation in Paris, Gina suddenly announced that she was backing off from the deal. Furious, Dewantoro lured the woman to a rented house in Brentwood, where he proceeded to bludgeon her to death before cutting off her hands, nose and heart. About a month later, he repeated the act with his 26-year-old brother, Eri Triharto Dharmawan, whom he also bludgeoned to death at an apartment in West Los Angeles.

In an attempt to cover his tracks, Dewantoro then dug up the bodies of all three victims from their respective burial sites and moved them to a storage facility in Sherman Oaks, where they were kept until the following year, when he transported each body using a hand truck to a U-Haul storage facility in Northridge.

== Discovery and arrest ==
Shortly after the slayings, Dewantoro fled to Jakarta, but continued to pay the rent for the storage using both his and his mother's money, telling her that his brother was still using it. On August 10, 1994, the storage unit was opened and the decomposing bodies of the victims were found. Eager to locate its owner, Det. Ted Ball inspected any checks sent to the address, finding two: one mailed by Dewantoro's mother, another that was covered with his fingerprints. This information was relayed to authorities in Jakarta, who promptly captured the suspect in the capital in January 1995.

During his interrogation by Indonesian authorities, Dewantoro confessed that he had indeed killed Aswan and Dharmawan, but denied killing Mirchandini, claiming instead that his brother had killed him in a dispute. His account wasn't believed and he was charged with all three murders by an Indonesian court, as he was an Indonesian citizen and because there was no extradition treaty between the two countries. In an act of cooperation, detectives Ted Ball and Ed Ramirez, as well as 14 other individuals, traveled to Indonesia, where they would serve as witnesses in the trial.

== Trial, imprisonment and release ==
When news broke of the incident, the case became a sensation in both countries due to its sheer brutality. Police officers from Jakarta traveled all the way to Los Angeles to collect evidence to present at the trial, including guns, bullets and police photos depicting the victims' decomposing bodies. Following a lengthy trial, Harnoko Dewantoro was found guilty and sentenced to death by Judge G. K. Sukarata in 1997, and subsequently sent to Cipinang Penitentiary Institution to await his execution.

In the following years, Dewantoro wrote two petitions for clemency to the government, both of which were denied on account of the nature of his crimes. The prosecutor who handled his case, Muhammad Yusuf, said that he would support any decision made, pointing out that he was the last descendant of his family (his other brother had died, and his mother was elderly) and that he was a well-behaved prisoner who never participated in riots and even taught English classes to his fellow inmates.

In October 2019, he was one of the prisoners interviewed on by Tagar on prison conditions in Cipinang, following the escape of convict Eddy Tansil. On November 20 that same year, he was pardoned and allowed to leave prison on conditional parole.

=== Reported death of son ===
In November 2011, a 17-year-old student at Pangudi Luhur High School, Raafi Aga Winasya Benyamin, was stabbed to death at the Shy Rooftop café in Jakarta's Kemang neighborhood. According to journalist Linda Djalil, Raafi was a son of Dewantoro. This theory was put into question by Dewantoro's former lawyers, Ruhut Sitompul and Henry Yosodiningrat, who were only aware that their client had had a daughter.

== See also ==
- List of serial killers in the United States

== Bibliography ==
- Daniel Pascoe (March 19, 2019). Last Chance for Life: Clemency in Southeast Asian Death Penalty Cases. Oxford University Press. ISBN 978-0198809715.
- Nur Muhammad Wahyu Kuncoro (2012). 96 Legal Cases that Shook Indonesia (in Indonesian). GET ASA SUCCESS. ISBN 978-9790131903.
