= Miranda Yap =

Singaporean chemical engineer (1948–2015)

Miranda Gek Sim Yap (August 1948 – 14 October 2015), also abbreviated as M.Yap or MGS Yap, was a professor in the Chemical and Biomolecular Engineering Department of the National University of Singapore, and the Executive Director of the Bioprocessing Technology Institute at the Agency for Science, Technology and Research of Singapore (A*STAR).

== Education ==
Yap earned her PhD in chemical engineering at the University of Toronto in 1979; she had previously received a basic degree in applied chemistry from University of Singapore, now known as the National University of Singapore (NUS), and a master's degree in biochemical engineering at University College London in 1973.

== Career ==
She returned to Singapore in 1982 to join NUS. With a government grant, she helped to establish the Bioprocessing Technology Unit (BTU) in 1990, which was later renamed as Bioprocessing Technology Centre (BTC) in 1995 as a National research centre for bioprocessing technology with Yap as the Director. In 2003, the centre was renamed the Bioprocessing Technology Institute (BTI) and relocated to the new Biopolis research centre in Singapore. She also founded two organisations, the Centre for Natural Product Research (now called Merlion Pharmaceuticals) and the Biopharmaceutical Manufacturing Technology Center (now called A-Bio Pharma). During her career, she published 58 papers in peer-reviewed journals.

In February 2006, Yap was named a Foreign Associate to the United States National Academy of Engineering. Her election citation noted "her outstanding achievements in education, research and management in the field of mammalian cell culture". She is the only female scientist and second Singaporean to be elected to the academy. She was awarded the President's Science and Technology Medal in 2009, becoming the first female winner of Singapore's most prestigious science prize.

Yap was named Executive Director of A*STAR Graduate Academy (A*GA) in November 2006, focusing on talent management and development in partnership with Imperial College London.

She has been a lecturer in the Advanced Course in Cell Technology at the University of Minnesota.

== Personal ==
Yap was married to Dr Yap Kian Tiong and died in Singapore on October 14, 2015, five years after suffering from an aneurysm.
