= Singapore Educational Media Service =

The Singapore Educational Media Service (SEMS), formerly the Educational Television Service (ETV) was a unit of the Teachers' Training College, producing television programmes for schools. Its programmes were carried on Channel 8 from 1967 to 1983, being replaced by those of the Curriculum Development Institute of Singapore.

== History ==
The service was announced in December 1966, starting on 30 January 1967. Programmes were produced at the TTC facilities at Paterson Road and were in Malay, Chinese and English, being screened from 8:30am to 12:45pm. It was officially inaugurated the week before, on 23 January 1967, by Minister of Education Ong Pang Boon. In March, the Embassy of Japan provided nine films on Japanese life, produced by the Japanese government, to the service.

In July 1967, ETV planned expanding its services to include adult education. Five further films from the Japanese embassy were donated in September, on refrigerators, valves, calculators, safety precautions and the energy of water.

With the impending introduction of adult educational programmes, a new schedule was being assembled. The first session would now start at 7:50am. Plans to make programmes for primary schools were shelved due to lack of funds. The first adult education programme, English for Everyone, aired on 23 January 1968, and consisted of two versions, in Malay and Mandarin, both with 39 lessons each. A new media centre was proposed in April 1969.

In June 1970, ETV was working out details for the creation of programmes for pre-university classes from January next year. These programmes began on 18 January 1971. In June of that year, following the visit of British David Butts, a plan was proposed to expand its services.

On 12 July 1974, the Educational Television Service was reorganised and renamed Singapore Educational Media Service.

SEMS was absorbed into the Curriculum Development Institute of Singapore when it was formed in 1980. SEMS programmes were still produced in black and white; in 1982, it was decided that it would convert to colour by July 1983. Its programmes upon the conversion to colour fell under the CDIS umbrella.
