= Singapore Underground Road System =

Proposed road system in Singapore

The Singapore Underground Road System (SURS) (Chinese: 地下道路系统; Malay: Sistem Jalan Bawah Tanah Singapura) was a proposed road system in Singapore. Fully underground, the project comprised two 15 km-long, 2-4 lane concentric ring tunnels around the Central Area of the country, with 8 interchanges and 33 entrances and exits. The capital cost was estimated to be at S$2.4 billion with a construction period of 15 years. The project was first considered in the 1980s and was seen as a way to cater for increasing traffic growth in and out of the city-centre.

== History ==
On 29 August 2017, the Land Transport Authority (LTA) ultimately scrapped this project as part of a shift to a "car-lite society." This comes after enhancements to the Mass Rapid Transit (MRT) network and changes to land use policies over the years since the project's conceptualisation. As a result, land safeguarded for the project since 1993 was freed up for other developmental purposes, which allowed for greater flexibility by developers.
