= Murder of Spencer Tuppani =

2017 murder of a man in Singapore

Spencer Tuppani
- Born: Spencer Sanjay Tuppani Shamlal Tuppani c. 1979; Singapore
- Died: 10 July 2017 (aged 38); Boon Tat Street, Singapore
- Cause of death: Murdered
- Known for: Murder victim
- Spouse(s): Felicia Keh Lay Hong (m. 18 February 2000 - d. unknown); Shyller Tan Cheng Cheng (m. 17 July 2004)
- Children: 3 (with Shyller Tan); 2 (with Joan Yeo)
- Parent: Tham Poh Kwai (mother)

On 10 July 2017, 69-year-old Tan Nam Seng (Chinese: 陈南成; Pe̍h-ōe-jī: Tân Nâm-sêng; born 1948) stabbed his son-in-law, 38-year-old Spencer Sanjay Tuppani Shamlal Tuppani, in broad daylight at Telok Ayer Street, Singapore. Tuppani escaped and Tan gave chase, however Tuppani collapsed along Boon Tat Street and subsequently died from his injuries.

== Background ==
Tan Nam Seng founded a port management services company TNS Shipping in 1974. Over the years, he expanded it into a family-run business with his three daughters working for him. Spencer Tuppani married Tan's eldest daughter, Shyller Tan Cheng Cheng (Chinese: 陈青青; Pe̍h-ōe-jī: Tân Chheng-chheng) in July 2004, and worked for Tan in one of the companies, TNS Ocean Lines. The couple had two daughters and one son between 2007 and 2011. Tuppani had "sold practically everything he owned" to invest in the firm when it was on the brink of bankruptcy during the economic crisis of 2007–2008. The firm reportedly had a turnover of $2 million in 2003 when Tuppani first joined, but by 2014, its turnover had exceeded $100 million.

== Attack ==
On 10 July 2017 at about 1.20pm, Tuppani was having lunch with three friends at a coffee shop along Telok Ayer Street when he was spotted by Tan who was driving past. Angry that Tuppani had been ignoring and avoiding his attempts to discuss business matters, Tan decided to enter the coffee shop and confront Tuppani. He told Tuppani "you are too much" in Hokkien, pulled out a knife which he had kept in his sling bag, and stabbed him three times in quick succession. One of the stab wounds penetrated his main artery. Tuppani ran towards Boon Tat Street while Tan gave chase, and eventually collapsed in front of a restaurant.

After Tuppani collapsed, Tan calmly put down the knife. He then called his daughter, Shyller Tan, over the phone, saying: "I couldn't sleep at night. I have already stabbed him. Don't cry. I am old already and I am not afraid to go to jail. What is done is done." When employees of the restaurant attempted to help Tuppani, Tan pushed them away, saying: "This is my son-in-law, don't help him, let him die." Tan calmly sat down and remained at the scene until police arrived and arrested him.

Tuppani was taken to Singapore General Hospital, where he was subsequently pronounced dead at 2.13pm.

== Trial ==
On 20 August 2020, the trial of Tan began. Tan pleaded guilty to one count of culpable homicide not amounting to murder. According to the prosecution, Tan was suffering from major depressive disorder at the time, which amounted to diminished responsibility. Tan's depression was caused by Tuppani having an affair with another woman, Joan Yeo Gek Lin, as well as worries that Tuppani was cheating him of his family business.

The prosecution asked for 12 years' imprisonment, citing that there should be a deterrent to other people from taking matters into their own hands. The defence asked for 7½ years, as due to Tan's old age, a longer sentence would practically be a life imprisonment.

The company did not perform well between 2012 and 2016. When business improved in 2016, Tuppani suggested selling it to a bigger corporation. Tan, who was contemplating retirement, left the sale to Tuppani. Leading up to the sale, Tuppani persuaded some of the shareholders, including Tan and Shyller Tan, to assign their shares to him to boost his stake in the company, so the buyer of the company would not have control of it, which they agreed. The sale went through, and Tuppani was appointed CEO of the firm in December 2016. However, Tan was unhappy as he received only about S$450,000 from the sale of his shares.

In early 2017, Shyller Tan found out that Tuppani had been having an affair with Joan Yeo and had two children from the affair. They agreed to a divorce, but continued to live in the same household with Tan and frequently quarrelled over issues relating to the divorce. Subsequent events led Tan to believe that Tuppani was planning to cheat him of his business, by divorcing Shyller Tan, after taking control of all the shares.

On 21 September 2020, High Court judge Justice Dedar Singh Gill sentenced Tan to 8½ years' jail, taking into account his major depressive disorder and his fast-deteriorating health. Tan was not caned as he was over 50 years of age. In the three years he spent in custody, Tan contracted tuberculosis and suffered two heart attacks, requiring a bypass surgery, among other medical issues.

== Aftermath ==
In November 2019, Tuppani's mother, 62-year-old Tham Poh Kwai, sued Tan Nam Seng for damages resulting from the loss of her son. Tham said her loss amounted to $5,050 a month, comprising a monthly allowance of $2,000, rent, utilities and medication.

In 2022, 42-year-old Jason Er Kok Yong (Chinese: 余国荣; Pe̍h-ōe-jī: Îr Kok-iông) and 46-year-old Lawrence Lim Soon Hwa (Chinese: 林顺华; Pe̍h-ōe-jī: Lîm Sūn-hôa), two friends of Tuppani, sued the administrators of Tuppani's estate - Shyller Tan, her sister Sherry Tan San San (Chinese: 陈珊珊; Pe̍h-ōe-jī: Tân San-san) and Tuppani's first wife Felicia Keh Lay Hong (Chinese: 郭莉虹; Pe̍h-ōe-jī: Keh Lē-hông). Er and Lim demanded a share of a $4.6 million Lorong Mambong property that was tenanted to a pub, Wala Wala Cafe Bar, claiming they and Tuppani agreed to each contribute $535,200 in cash towards the purchase of the property. On 29 August 2022, Justice Mavis Chionh dismissed the lawsuit, finding various aspects of Er and Lim's evidence to be "full of gaps", "riddled with inconsistencies" and "highly suspicious". A separate lawsuit was filed by Shyller, Sherry, and Keh as administrators of Tuppani's estate, against Tuppani's parents in 2023 in a bid to recover a Richard Mille watch or, alternatively, a sum of SGD $389,205.13 but it failed.

Tan Nam Seng was released from prison in early 2023. Tan died on 10 August 2025 at the age of 80 at home in his sleep due to heart attack.

== See also ==
- List of major crimes in Singapore
