= Blk71 =

Industrial building in Singapore

Coordinates: 1°17′48″N 103°47′12″E

BLOCK71 Singapore, commonly known as "Blk71", is a factory building located in the Ayer Rajah Industrial Estate of one-north, Singapore. The Economist referred to BLOCK71 as the heart of Singapore's technology start-up ecosystem and the world's most tightly packed entrepreneurial ecosystem. BLOCK71 has built up a strong innovation and entrepreneurship community, where entrepreneurs, investors, developers and mentors within the interactive digital media space are near each other. BLOCK71 is home to more than 100 start-ups, venture capital firms and tech incubators. It is also located near other technology hubs within Singapore, such as the Fusionopolis, Biopolis and National University of Singapore (NUS).

== History ==
The Ayer Rajah Industrial Estate was built in the 1970s by the Jurong Town Corporation as a series of flatted factories for manufacturing-based activities. A few blocks within this industrial estate, including Block 71, were initially planned for demolition. Blk71 was established in 2011 by NUS Enterprise, the Media Development Authority and SingTel Innov8 as a start-up hub at Block 71, known as Plug-In@Blk71.

In early 2015, Infocomm Investment, the investment arm of the Infocomm Development Authority of Singapore inaugurated the extension of Blk71 to neighboring Blk79 (dubbed BASH, which stands for Build Amazing Startups Here), which is also a refurbished industrial estate. A third and last unit, Blk73, designed for smaller startups, is being built up and should open in 2015.

== Plug-In@Blk71 ==
Plug-In@Blk71 is an incubation program that supports and provides start-ups in the interactive digital media space access to resources needed to effectively develop and market their solutions. It was set up by NUS Enterprise, the Media Development Authority and SingTel Innov8.

Managed by NUS Enterprise, Plug-In@Blk71 provides a common platform for entrepreneurs and stakeholders to meet, connect and accelerate the growth of ideas and start-ups. Since 2011, a strong start-up community has been established at Plug-In@Blk71, where people regularly share contacts, ideas and success stories, which has allowed the start-up scene to grow rapidly. Start-ups are given 24-hour access to Plug-In@Blk71.

Located on level 2 of Blk71, Plug-In@Blk71 provides hot-desking space for entrepreneurs to work on their ideas. There are some 30 entrepreneurs, start-ups and business ideas located at the hot-desking space each month, which typically stay there for several weeks, up to a few months. Plug-In@Blk71 has shared resources, including meeting rooms, a large seminar room, free internet access, pantry supplies and office equipment.

Regular entrepreneurial events are organised at Plug-In@Blk71 for the entrepreneurial community. There are approximately 3-5 events organised each week, including mentoring sessions, business clinics, VC pitching sessions, industrial sharing seminars and networking events.

== Start-ups ==
The companies based at Blk71 are typically technology start-ups. The majority of them are within the interactive digital media space, including Stream Media, which develops a mobile in-app payment platform, travelmob, which provides an online market place for vacation rentals across Asia, Daylight Studios, a mobile game developer and Appknox, a mobile security company. However, there are also a few hardware tech companies, such as Zimplistic, which is developing the world’s first automatic roti-maker and T.Ware, which is developing a wearable technology that provides deep pressure to calm autistic children.

== Incubators, accelerators and investors ==
There are approximately 30 organizations located at Blk71 that provide a range of funding and in-kind support, including angel investment, seed funding, series A, B and beyond. These include NUS Enterprise (which manages Plug-In@Blk71 as well as has additional incubation space on levels 1 and 3), and JFDI.Asia.
