= Uxoricide =

Act of killing one's wife or girlfriend

Uxoricide is the killing of one's own wife. It can also be used in the context of the killing of one's own girlfriend. Conversely, the killing of a husband or boyfriend is called mariticide. It comes from the Latin uxor meaning 'wife' and -cide, from caedere meaning 'to cut, to kill'. Though overall rates of spousal homicide have declined in the US since the 1970s, rates of uxoricide are significantly higher than rates of mariticide.

== Rates of uxoricide ==
Though overall rates of spousal violence and homicide in the US have declined since the 1970s, rates of uxoricide are significantly higher than rates of mariticide (the murder of a husband). Of the 2340 deaths at the hands of intimate partners in the US in 2007, female victims made up 70%. FBI data from the mid-1970s to mid-1980s found that for every 100 husbands who killed their wives in the United States, about 75 women killed their husbands. However, wives were more likely to kill their husbands than vice versa in some US cities including Chicago, Detroit, Houston, and St. Louis. Uxoricide rates varied among different demographic subgroups. In the US, 2002 murderers of spouses (husband and wives combined) were 69.4% white, 25.7% black and 4.8% Asian/Pacific Islander and 0.1 American Indian/ Alaska Native.

In the region of South-East Asia, 55% of all murdered women died at the hands of their partner, followed by 40% in the African region and 38% in the Americas. A 2013 study found that 38.6% of murders of women are committed by intimate partners.

According to Centers for Disease Control and Prevention, uxoricide made up 70% of the total spouse murders in the United States, data not including proxy murders conducted on behalf of the wife. FBI data from the mid-1970s to mid-1980s found that for every 100 husbands who killed their wives in the United States, about 75 women killed their husbands indicating a 3:4 ratio of mariticide to uxoricide.

== Psychodynamic explanations ==
=== Unconscious conflict ===
Proponents of psychodynamic theories have offered explanations for the mechanisms underlying the occurrence of uxoricide. It has been suggested that men who kill their partners experience both an unconscious dependence on their wife and a resentment of her. These men wish to leave the relationship, but unknowingly perceive themselves as too helpless to do so, which culminates in a belief that killing the wife is the only way to be free of her. This approach also offers an alternative explanation for instances where a man commits uxoricide and subsequent immediate suicide – the man ends his life not due to guilt, but instead due to his perceived helplessness and dependency.

=== Defense mechanisms ===
Links have also been established between violence in childhood and likelihood of uxoricide occurring. Psychodynamic researchers argue that being the victim of abuse in childhood leads to being a perpetrator of domestic abuse in adulthood via the route of defense mechanisms – in this case, violence is an unconscious defensive adaption to childhood trauma and other adverse events. Other psychodynamic researchers have reported that Thematic Apperception Tests reveal significant trends of rejection by a mother or wife in men who commit uxoricide. Psychoanalytic dream interpretation has also argued that unconscious conflict manifests into violent outbursts. For example, in one instance one man had experienced and recorded over 200 distressing, mostly violent dreams prior to murdering his wife.

== Risk factors ==
In slightly more than two-thirds of US spousal homicides, a verbal disagreement escalated to homicide.

=== Marital status ===
In two studies conducted in Canada and Britain, cohabiting women were found at greater risk of domestic violence and uxoricide than married women. Research has found that cohabiting women are nine times more likely to be killed by their intimate partner than married women. A number of possible reasons for this finding have been studied. Cohabiting women are more likely to be younger, have a lower level of education and are more likely to bring children from a previous relationship into their home with their new intimate partner. In addition to this heightened risk to a mother with stepchildren, the genetically unrelated stepfather also poses a risk to the child; research has shown that children are at much greater risk of violence and filicide (murder of a child) from stepfathers compared to a genetic father. This may be because investment from a stepfather reduces reproductive benefits. Research has found that the presence of stepchildren can significantly increase the risk of uxoricide for women. A large number of filicides are accompanied by uxoricide and suicide.

Additionally, cohabiting relationships have higher separation rates and males in these types of relationships may not feel in control of their intimate partners and may feel threatened by male sexual competitors. Research has found that a large proportion of uxoricide cases follow on from the male believing that his female intimate partner has been unfaithful or the female partner attempting to end the relationship. Research has shown that females often experience increased abuse following the termination of a relationship. An Australian study found that of a sample of uxoricide cases, 47% of women were murdered by their male intimate partner within two months of separating. Sexual jealousy may be a possible reason for this heightened risk following separation.

=== Partner separation ===
Another risk factor for uxoricide is estrangement. Women who choose to leave their partner are at higher risk of spousal homicide. These crimes have been termed "abandonment homicides", and are most commonly committed by men with childhood histories of abandonment and trauma, in conjunction with markedly low serotonin levels and frontal cortex damage that contribute to poor impulse control. The male is more likely to kill his mate before she has had the chance to form a new relationship with another man as he fears she will then devote her reproductive resources to a male rival's offspring. Therefore, by killing his partner he will avoid the reputational damage associated with intrasexual competition and will eliminate the chances of another man having access to a high value mate. This also explains why those women who have had children from a previous relationship are at higher risk of spousal homicide compared with those who have only had children with their current partner. The female partner has already devoted her reproductive resources to another man, therefore when she establishes a new relationship, the male becomes involved in the upbringing of another man's offspring which will damage his hierarchical status amongst intrasexual rivals.

=== Age ===
Research suggests that greater age disparities between partners can heighten the risk of spousal homicide, indicating the complex dynamics of power and control in relationships. For men, the emotional impact of infidelity can be more intense when their partner is younger, which may reflect societal pressures regarding masculinity and reproductive success. Women's fertility naturally decreases with age, making reproductive value a significant factor in how partners are perceived. This can lead to men prioritizing younger partners, reinforcing ageism and the objectification of women based on their reproductive potential. Furthermore, studies indicate that men may resort to more violent methods of killing (e.g., "hands-on" killing), when targeting partners viewed as having high reproductive value. "Hands on" refers to more violent methods such as using weapons, drowning, stabbing and strangling. Such findings highlight the urgent need for a deeper understanding of gender dynamics and the social constructs surrounding relationships and violence.

=== Culture and law ===
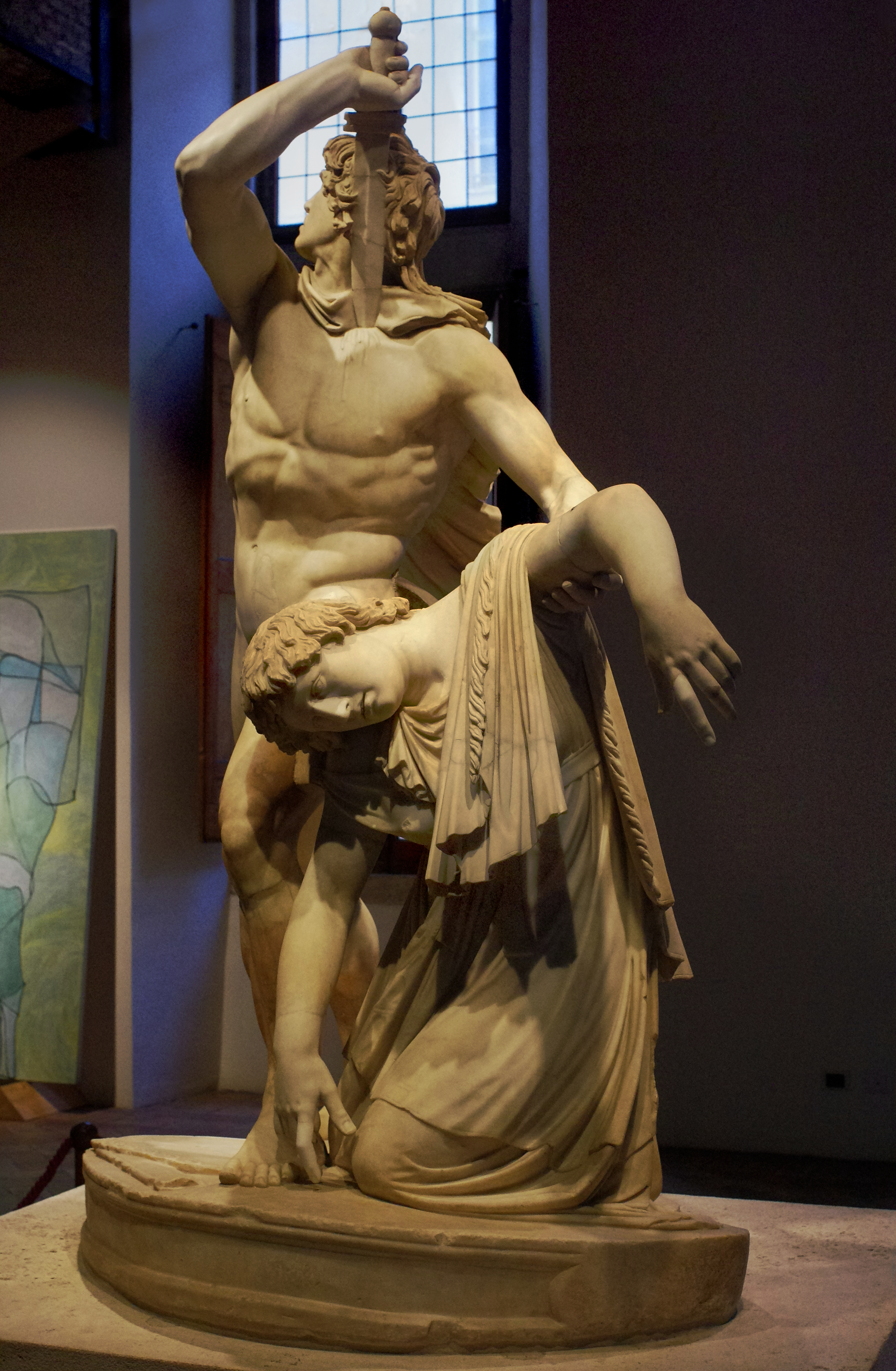
The Ludovisi Gaul killing himself and his wife, Roman copy after the Hellenistic original, Palazzo Massimo alle Terme

Some instances of uxoricide are facilitated by the culture of the victim and the perpetrator. For example, honor killings, whereby a man kills his wife because she has brought shame upon their family, are approved in some male-dominated, patriarchal societies. Approximately 42% of female victims of honour killings worldwide were killed because it was believed they had committed a "sexual impropriety". Other facilitating cultural norms include discriminatory family laws and articles in the criminal code which display leniency towards honor killings. In Turkey, it has been reported that little social stigma is attached to honor killings, and around 37% of those living in conservative areas believe that adulterous women should be killed. These attitudes favouring honor killings have also been echoed amongst children and adults in Jordan and India. In Uruguay, until 2017 crimes of passion related to adultery were tolerated under Article 36 of the Penal Code (The passion provoked by adultery) – Artículo 36. (La pasión provocada por el adulterio). On 22 December 2017, Article 36 of the Criminal Code was modified to remove the crime of passion. There had been ongoing political efforts to remove this provision from the criminal code since 2013. Uruguay has a very high rate of killing of women; according to a 2018 United Nations study, Uruguay has the second-highest rate of killings of women by current or former partners in Latin America, after the Dominican Republic.

Uxoricide can also be prevalent in countries where honor killings are not considered acceptable. In South Africa, for example, as many as five women are estimated to be killed each week by an intimate partner. It has been suggested that this high rate of uxoricide is a result of the prevalence of violence in South African society, and how it is deemed socially acceptable in many circumstances – conservative attitudes towards women in this society have been suggested to facilitate uxoricide. Studies conducted in Italy exhibit similar findings, reporting that a man's cultural values concerning the position of women in society links to his likelihood of committing uxoricide.

== Effects on children ==
When a parent kills another parent, children experience significant trauma. The other parent is likely to be in prison or may have died by suicide and therefore, the child will go through significant loss. The child has lost not only one parent but has also lost the other parent who would have helped and supported them through this loss. This type of extreme traumatic event can have serious implications for a child's wellbeing and mental health.

== Known or suspected examples ==
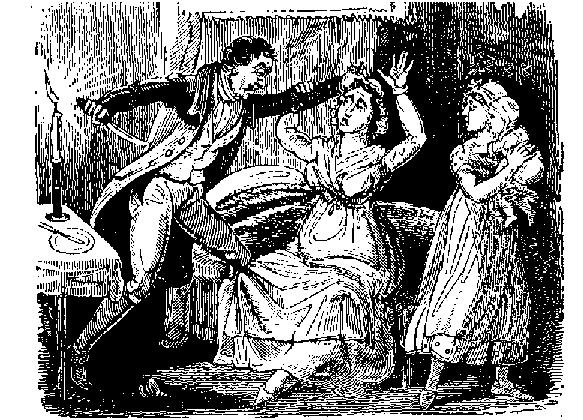
18th century illustration of Matthias Brinsden murdering his wife

- Cambyses II of Persia married two of his sisters and installed the younger as queen consort of Egypt. During his insanity, he murdered her for weeping for their brother Smerdis, whom Cambyses had murdered.
- Ptolemy XI of Egypt had his wife and stepmother, Berenice III, murdered nineteen days after their wedding in 80 BC. Afterwards, Ptolemy was lynched by the citizens of Alexandria, with whom Berenice was very popular.
- Herod the Great had his second wife, Mariamne I, strangled for suspected adultery, though she was innocent of the charges. According to Josephus, regret over this act almost caused Herod to go insane.
- Roman Emperor Tiberius probably had his second wife, Julia, starved to death in 14 AD, while she was in exile on Pandataria. Their marriage was unhappy, and he had been publicly embarrassed by her adultery years earlier. Her alleged paramour, Sempronius Gracchus, was executed around the same time on Tiberius's orders.
- Roman Emperor Nero ordered the death of his first wife, Octavia, soon after divorcing her in 62 AD. He also reportedly kicked his second wife, Poppaea Sabina, to death in 65 AD after an argument.
- Emperor Wen of Western Wei, ordered his first empress, Empress Yifu, to commit suicide after he had deposed her status in 540, due to the pressure of Yuwen Tai and Empress Yujiulu, as well as his puppet status.
- Minamoto no Yoshitsune, ordered his wife Sato Gozen to commit suicide, since he knew that he lost to his brother Minamoto no Yoritomo, in 1189.
- Prince John of Portugal, Duke of Valencia de Campos murdered his wife María Teles de Meneses in 1379, after her sister Queen Leonor Teles, fearing for the succession of her daughter Beatrice and her own position as regent, accused her of adultery.
- King Henry VIII of England had two of his six wives executed: Anne Boleyn on charges of adultery, treason and incest, and Katherine Howard on the charge of adultery.
- Chongzhen Emperor forced his wife Empress Zhou to commit suicide while the army of the rebel Li Zicheng were approaching the capital through Juyong Pass on April 24, 1644.
- George Forster murdered his wife and child by drowning them in Paddington Canal, London: he was hanged at Newgate on 18 January 1803.
- Edward William Pritchard (1825–1865) was an English doctor who was convicted of murdering his wife and mother-in-law by poisoning. He was the last person to be publicly executed in Glasgow.
- The Reverend John Selby Watson (1804–1884) was sentenced to death in 1872 for killing his wife, but a public outcry led to his sentence being reduced to life imprisonment. The case is notable for Watson's use of a plea of insanity as his defence.
- Kenneth Brown (1837–1876), father of Edith Cowan (1861–1932; the first Australian woman to become a member of parliament) shot and killed his second wife, Mary (née Tindall). Brown was convicted of murder and hanged five months later.
- William Henry Bury (1859–1889) was executed in Dundee, Scotland, for the murder of his wife Ellen in 1889. He was suspected by some of being Jack the Ripper.
- Dr Hawley Harvey Crippen (1862–1910) was an American homeopathic physician hanged in Pentonville Prison, London, England, on 23 November 1910, for the murder of his wife, Cora Henrietta Crippen.
- George Joseph Smith (1872–1915), the "Brides in the Bath Murderer", was convicted and subsequently hanged for drowning three women, all of whom he had trigamously married, between 1908 and 1914.
- Herbert Rowse Armstrong (1869–1922), a solicitor in Hay-on-Wye, was hanged for the murder of his wife by arsenic poisoning.
- Dr Buck Ruxton (1899–1936) murdered and dismembered his wife in Lancaster, England, in 1935.
- Beat author William S. Burroughs (1914–1997) shot and killed his wife, Joan Vollmer (1923–1951), during a drunken recreation of the William Tell act. Vollmer's death was ruled a culpable homicide after Mexican police investigated.
- William Unek killed his wife and burned down their hut on 11 February 1957 in a killing spree.
- Tommy Zeigler case, 1975.
- Philosopher Louis Althusser strangled his wife to death on 16 November 1980. He was not tried, on the grounds of diminished responsibility, and was instead committed to a psychiatric hospital. He was discharged in 1983.
- Richard Crafts of Newtown, Connecticut, was convicted of killing his wife Helle in 1986. The crime became known as the "woodchipper murder" because of the way he disposed of her body.
- On 23 October 1989, Charles Stuart shot his pregnant wife in the head and shot himself in the abdomen, claiming to have been the victim of a carjacking. The child was born alive, but later died from injuries sustained in the murder.
- On 21 April 1992, Jesse Anderson stabbed his wife, Barbara E. Anderson, thirty-seven times.
- In August 1996, Janet March disappeared from her home in a suburb of Nashville, Tennessee. Her husband Perry was convicted of murdering her despite the absence of her body ten years later, after his father had confessed to helping him dispose of the body, whose location he could not accurately remember.
- On 5 May 2000, Kristine Fitzhugh was murdered by her husband, Kenneth Fitzhugh. He was sentenced to 15 years to life in prison. He died in 2012 from a terminal illness.
- On 14 May 2001, Anthony Ler manipulated and threatened a 15-year-old youth to murder his wife in order to obtain full ownership of her flat and custody of their daughter in midst of divorce proceedings. Ler was hanged on 13 December 2002 for abetment of murder while the minor was jailed indefinitely due to his age. He was released in November 2018.
- Cal Harris, of Spencer, New York, was accused of killing his wife Michele on 11 September 2001. He was tried for her murder four times before being acquitted in 2016 by a judge. She has not been seen since the night she disappeared.
- Mark Winger was convicted in 2002 of murdering his wife, Donnah Winger, in 1995.
- Murder of Laci Peterson, 24 December 2002.
- On 17 May 2004, taxi driver G. Krishnasamy Naidu used a chopper to hack his wife to death and nearly decapitated her at her workplace, and he was found to be suffering from morbid jealousy as a result of his wife's multiple affairs with other men during their 20-year marriage. Krishnasamy was originally sentenced to death for murder, but he was ultimately convicted of manslaughter upon an appeal, and sentenced to life imprisonment in 2006.
- Mark Hacking murdered his pregnant wife Lori Hacking on 19 July 2004. He was convicted and sentenced to life in prison in 2005.
- On 2 December 2005, at his Dover Road Singapore flat, 44-year-old condominium caretaker Mohammad Zam Abdul Rashid brutally battered his 38-year-old wife Ramona Johari after he accused her of getting close to a colleague, and the brutal attack caused Ramona to die two days later. Mohammad Zam, who suffered from diminished responsibility induced by frontal lobe syndrome, was sentenced to life imprisonment for manslaughter in September 2006.
- On 10 October 2006, Hans Reiser was arrested and subsequently convicted of the murder of his wife, Nina Reiser.
- On 9 February 2007, Tara Lynn Grant was murdered by her husband Stephen Grant.
- Professional wrestler Chris Benoit murdered his wife Nancy and their son Daniel over a three-day period from 22 June 2007 to 24 June 2007, before hanging himself in his weight room.
- In December 2009, Susan Cox Powell disappeared, and her body was never found. Her husband, Joshua Powell, was the main suspect of her presumed murder, but he died by suicide in February 2012 after killing their sons. The case was closed in 2013 when police concluded that Joshua and his brother murdered Susan and disposed of her body.
- On 10 February 2010, Argentine drummer Eduardo Vázquez, a member of Callejeros and survivor of the 2004 Cromañón nightclub fire, set his wife Wanda Taddei on fire after dousing her with alcohol. He was sentenced to life imprisonment.
- In March 2016, 63-year-old Wong Chik Yeok was slashed to death by her 68-year-old husband Kong Peng Yee, who was suffering from a brief psychotic delusion at the time he killed his wife. Kong was jailed for two years in 2017, although the sentence was raised to six years in June 2018 upon the prosecution's appeal.
- Watts family murders (2018).
- Murdaugh family murders (2021). Richard "Alex" Murdaugh shot and killed his wife, Maggie, and their 22-year-old son, Paul, on the family's hunting estate.

== See also ==
- Avunculicide, the killing of one's uncle
- Bride-burning, a form of uxoricide specific to South Asia
- Familicide, the killing of one's close family members (children, spouses, siblings, or parents)
- Filicide, the killing of one's child
- Fratricide, the killing of one's brother
- Mariticide, the killing of one's husband
- Matricide, the killing of one's mother
- Nepoticide, the killing of one's nephew
- Parricide, the killing of one's parents or another close relative
- Patricide, the killing of one's father
- Prolicide, the killing of one's offspring
- Sororicide, the killing of one's sister
- Intimate partner violence
