= 2014 Tampines flat stabbing =

2014 fatal stabbing of a woman by her father-in-law in Tampines, Singapore

Ong Guat Leng
- Ong Guat Leng, who was killed in 2014
- Born: Ong Guat Leng c. 1960; Colony of Singapore
- Died: 21 August 2014 (aged 54); Tampines, Singapore
- Cause of death: Death by stabbing
- Occupation: Housewife
- Known for: Murder victim
- Spouse: Char Yeng Kong
- Children: Two daughters and one son

On 21 August 2014, at her flat in Tampines, 54-year-old Ong Guat Leng (Note: Her name was also spelt as Ong Guat Heng) (王月玲 Wáng Yuèlíng) was stabbed to death by her 80-year-old father-in-law Char Chin Fah (Note: His name was also spelt as Char Chin Fa) (谢振发 Xiè Zhènfā), (Note: His Chinese name is also spelt as 谢镇华 Xiè Zhènhuá or 谢进发 Xiè Jìnfā) who was arrested and charged with murder. It was revealed through investigations and court proceedings that Char did not have a good relationship with Ong, partly due to Char being "difficult to live with" and Ong having scolded Char and argued with Char over this and allegedly disrespected him. Eventually, one of these arguments on the day before the murder drove Char to the edge and he therefore grabbed a knife the next day, slammed the sleeping Ong's head against a wall before he knifed her to death. Char was eventually sentenced to eight years in jail after pleading guilty to a reduced charge of manslaughter in April 2016. Ten years after the murder, Char, who had since completed his sentence, died at the age of 90 in February 2024.

== Fatal stabbing ==
On the morning of 21 August 2014, a 54-year-old Singaporean woman was found dead at a flat in Tampines, and on that same day itself, an 80-year-old Singaporean man, reportedly the victim's father-in-law, was arrested for the woman's death, which had been classified as murder, and the suspect was expected to be charged with murder the following day.

The victim was identified as 54-year-old Ong Guat Leng, who had 12 siblings and was married with two daughters and one son (all aged in their 20s) at the time of the murder, and her children were already married. Ong, who had a knife embedded on her chest, was said to have been found lying in a pool of blood by one of her daughters, and called the police. The police cordoned off the area and conducted a search in the flat and even the rubbish chute to retrieve evidence; the police retrieved a blood-stained T-shirt and a handkerchief from the flat, and from the rubbish chute, they recovered a bloodstained light grey short and a dented black metal rod measured 1m long. Several neighbours told police that they heard a woman screaming on that morning itself, shortly before Ong was found murdered. It was also reported that at around the time when his daughter found her mother's body, the suspect had arrived at Bedok North Neighbourhood Police Centre to give himself up for the crime, which happened when Ong's husband, son and sister - who all lived in the same flat as well - were at work.

When the incident first came to light, many Singaporeans were shocked at the case, partly due to the fact that an 80-year-old man was being accused of killing his daughter-in-law, and the suspect was believed to be one of the oldest persons arrested and investigated for murder so far. Many residents of Ong's neighbourhood in Tampines were also shocked by the death of Ong, whom they described as a woman who liked to smile and was friendly, and loved to sing karaoke. Residents also described Ong's father-in-law as a friendly man who looked tall and skinny, and polite to other people, and the family was generally friendly people.

However, it was noted by the residents that the old man and his daughter-in-law did not have a good relationship with each other, as they reportedly quarreled with each other very often about a year after the suspect moved in a few years before the murder. A hawker from a nearby coffee shop stated that he saw the suspect who came to the coffee shop daily at 6am to watch the television before he left at around 3pm or 4pm, and reason being he did not want to see his daughter-in-law, with whom he cannot see eye to eye with Ong on certain things. It was speculated that the murder could have happened due to the acrimonious relationship between Ong and her father-in-law.

== Murder charge and remand ==
On 22 August 2014, the suspect, 80-year-old Char Chin Fah, was officially charged with murder in a district court for unlawfully causing the death of Ong Guat Leng. As the offence of murder carries the death penalty in Singapore, Char would be sentenced to death by hanging if found guilty. The police were given a court order to place Char in police custody at the Central Police Division to allow him to assist them in their investigations.

On 27 August 2014, Char Chin Fah was remanded for psychiatric evaluation at the medical center of Changi Prison. Char's family members engaged veteran criminal lawyer Ramesh Tiwary to represent Char in his upcoming murder trial, and he briefly appeared in court on that day to act for Char. Some of Char's family members were reportedly present at the courtroom. Char was scheduled to return to court for a preliminary hearing on 17 September 2014.

== Char Chin Fah's confession ==
Char Chin Fah
- 2014 police mugshot of Char Chin Fah
- Born: Char Chin Fah c. 1934; Singapore, Straits Settlements
- Died: 25 February 2024 (aged 90); Singapore
- Spouse: Unnamed wife
- Children: Char Yeng Kong (son); Char Yeng Keang (son); Jenny Char (daughter)
- Status: Released since 2022; Died in 2024
- Motive: Due to anger
- Conviction: Manslaughter (one count)
- Criminal charge: 1st charge: Murder of Ong Guat Leng
- Penalty: Eight years' imprisonment

The following was the official version of the murder of Ong Guat Leng, based on Char Chin Fah's confession and the evidence pieced together by the police investigations.

Char Chin Fah, who was married with two sons and one daughter, formerly worked as a tailor, bus driver and coffee shop attendant in his younger years before retirement, and he began to live with his eldest son Char Yeng Kong (alias David Char), who was a warrant officer of the Singapore Armed Forces (SAF). Char shared a flat with five people - his eldest son, his son's wife Ong Guat Leng, the couple's grandson and the grandson's girlfriend, and Ong's younger sister - in Tampines and he slept at a makeshift bed in the living room, while Char's wife and two children lived elsewhere in Singapore. During the time when Char was living with his eldest son, Char had an acrimonious relationship with Ong and they often quarreled with each other. Based on the evidence adduced, Char was reportedly "difficult to live with", because he often exhibited socially inappropriate behaviours like often leaving his dirty socks on the dining table and leaving the toilet door open whenever he urinated. This behaviour annoyed Ong, who was then on medication for an anxiety disorder, and she often berated Char for what he did; her psychiatric condition often made Ong nag and repeat herself when she felt agitated. Char did not like how Ong often called him by his full name and scolded him, and felt that Ong was disrespectful, and thus often complained to his younger son and daughter about Ong.

On the evening before the murder, Char once again argued with the couple, who were unhappy with him for not washing a curtain. Char felt extremely angry and betrayed, given that his elder son did not speak up for him and sided with Ong. Due to this, Char formulated the plan to murder Ong, and hence, the next morning, at 5.30am, Char went outdoors for his morning exercise and eat his breakfast at a nearby coffee shop. At the coffee shop, Char penned down a suicide note, which was addressed to his daughter, telling her that he had done something serious and instructed his daughter to settle his personal matters. Char also drank a whole bottle of stout "to gather more courage" before he proceeded to kill Ong. Char waited until all the other occupants in the flat to leave for work, which would leave Ong alone at home sleeping.

Char returned home while Ong was still asleep, and he went into the kitchen to choose potential weapons before he settled on the sharpest kitchen knife, measured 20cm long. Char went to the master bedroom with the knife, and he approached Ong, grabbing onto her hair and slammed her head against the wall repeatedly. Ong managed to free herself and ran off to another room but Char caught up with her. Although Ong begged Char to forgive her, Char did not relent and he continued attacking her. After a struggle between both of them, Char pursued Ong, who broke free and fled into the master bedroom, but before Ong could close the door, Char caught up with her and barged through the bedroom door. Inside the bedroom, Char overpowered Ong and knifed Ong four times; the final stab wound was delivered on the left side of Ong's chest and penetrated her heart. Char reportedly told police he knew from a documentary that the heart was in that spot where the final stab wound was inflicted. An autopsy found four stab wounds in her chest area (two of which penetrated the heart and left lung), fractures on her skull, as well as bruises, abrasions and swellings on her face and body.

After murdering Ong, Char washed up and changed his clothes before he called his children to inform them of the murder, and he fled to his daughter Jenny Char's house. Char originally wanted to hand over his belongings to his daughter and commit suicide, but he was persuaded to stay and wait for his younger son Char Yeng Keang, who arrived soon after. When he arrived to meet his father, Char's younger son convinced his father to surrender himself and asked him to not commit suicide. Char eventually agreed and his son thus drove him to a police station in Bedok to turn himself in, just when the death of Ong was uncovered simultaneously.

== Trial and sentencing ==
On 25 April 2016, 82-year-old Char Chin Fah was brought to trial at the High Court for the murder of his 54-year-old daughter-in-law Ong Guat Leng. By then, the charge of murder was lowered to a lesser offence of culpable homicide not amounting to murder, or manslaughter. Based on the psychiatric reports of Dr Stephen Phang of the Institute of Mental Health, Char was suffering from a personality disorder and acute paranoid reaction at the time of the murder, and it sufficiently impaired his mental responsibility at the time of the offence. Therefore, the murder charge was reduced on the grounds of diminished responsibility, which allowed Char to escape the death penalty for murdering Ong. The possible punishments warranted for Char was either life imprisonment or up to 20 years' jail, in addition to a possible fine or caning.

Char pleaded guilty to the reduced charge and a sentencing hearing was convened on the same day before the trial judge Woo Bih Li of the High Court. The prosecution, led by Deputy Public Prosecutor (DPP) Mohamed Faizal Mohamed Abdul Kadir, sought a sentence of ten years' imprisonment. DPP Mohamed Faizal argued that it was a premeditated killing committed with plenty of planning and selection of suitable weapons and timeframe on Char's part, and it was a deliberate and brutal attack initiated on his daughter-in-law. The prosecution also brought attention to Char's psychiatric condition, stating that Char lacked insight in his condition and made reference to Dr Phang's report, in which Dr Phang stated that while Char's "perceived villainess has been eliminated", he would still possibly develop similar paranoid reactions towards his surviving family members in the future should he returned to live with them. In his own words, DPP Mohamed Faizal quoted this contention, "Innocent members of the public and his remaining family members ought to be fully protected from a similar episode of mindless violence by the offender."

On the other hand, Char's lawyer Ramesh Tiwary urged the court to sentence Char to five years in jail. He urged the court to consider that Char had voluntarily surrendered himself to the police and fully cooperated with the investigators, and Char "felt insulted and belittled" by Ong and was under the assumption that his eldest son did not defend him and sided with his wife. Tiwary also stated that leniency should also be exercised in view of Char's advanced age and poor health. In fact, during his remand, Char's health had deteriorated and he underwent two surgeries - one for a urinary tract problem and the other to remove a tumour on his ear - since his arrest.

On that same day, Justice Woo Bih Li delivered his decision, sentencing Char to eight years' imprisonment for the manslaughter of his daughter-in-law; Char did not receive caning as he was more than 50 years old at the time of sentencing. In his oral sentencing remarks, Justice Woo stated that this was a serious offence where it originally would have attracted a harsher punishment, but he refrained from imposing a longer jail term in Char's case, stating that he faced some "hesitation" due to Char's advanced age and he felt that it was important that the jail term should not amount to a life sentence for Char. Due to this, Justice Woo opted for a custodial sentence of eight years for 82-year-old Char Chin Fah, whose jail term was backdated to the date of his arrest. It was reported that Char's daughter had arranged for her father to live with her permanently, and both she and her younger brother still regularly visited their father in prison, although they did not keep in contact with their older brother, whose wife Char had killed two years prior.

== Char's release and death ==
After completing his jail term of eight years, Char Chin Fah was released since 2022, although his exact date of release was not known, and returned to live together with his daughter.

According to some Chinese-language newspapers, Char never once again mentioned his late daughter-in-law's death to avoid bringing back sad memories. Char's family likewise never talked about the case again to avoid recalling the sad past and moved on. According to a relative, Char's children had forgiven him for what happened, including his eldest son, who regularly visited his father in prison and likewise continued to visit Char in his sister's home. However, the children of Ong Guat Leng hated their grandfather and never forgave him for having killed their mother. During the final years of his life, Char was diagnosed with old-age dementia, and he had lost most of his memories from the past.

On 25 February 2024, about ten years after the murder of Ong Guat Leng, 90-year-old Char Chin Fah died in his daughter's home. His funeral was conducted for five days and his remains were cremated. Throughout the funeral, Ong's children did not pay respects to their grandfather and never appeared at the wake, although all of Char's three children and other grandchildren and relatives were present at the funeral. A family member, who chose to remain anonymous, told reporters that Char had died peacefully due to old age and lived a quiet and uneventful life since the incident, and described him as a "good father" in spite of what he had done. The family member declined to comment further on the case and its aftermath, stating that the family wished to not recall the incident anymore and hoped to find closure with Char's death.

== See also ==
- 2019 Toa Payoh chopper attack
- List of major crimes in Singapore
