= 2012 Jurong West killing =

2012 murder of a woman in Singapore

Killing of Elsie Lie Lek Chee
- Location: Jurong West, Singapore
- Date: 30 March 2012
- Attack type: Stabbing
- Victim: Elsie Lie Lek Chee
- Perpetrator: Gabriel Lee Haw Ling
- Convictions: Manslaughter

On 30 March 2012, inside her rented flat in Jurong West, Singapore, 24-year-old administrative officer Elsie Lie Lek Chee (赖莲慈 Lài Liáncí) was murdered by her 37-year-old fiancé Gabriel Lee Haw Ling (李豪霖 Lǐ Háolín), who attempted to decapitate her and also gouged her eyes out.

Lee was arrested and initially charged with murder. It was revealed that Lee, who was raised in a strongly Catholic family, had suffered from a brief psychotic disorder that caused him to believe Lie was possessed and he therefore killed her in an attempt to perform an exorcism. Lee was put on trial for the lesser charge of manslaughter, and sentenced to ten years' imprisonment after he pleaded guilty in February 2017.

== Murder investigation ==
On 31 March 2012, Elsie Lie Lek Chee, a 24-year-old administrative officer was found brutally killed inside her rented flat in Jurong West.

On that day itself, the police responded to a report that led them to the Jurong West flat, where they found the mutilated body of a young woman, together with a man, the woman's boyfriend, who was arrested at the scene. The victim, 24-year-old Elsie Lie Lek Chee, was pronounced dead on the scene by paramedics. The police cordoned the area for investigations and searched for evidence. The most shocking aspect of this case was, Lie's eyes were being forcibly dug out by her boyfriend, and these eyeballs were found at the grass patch below the apartment block. Witnesses, including a Bangladeshi couple and a third Bangladeshi man who rented rooms from Lie's rented flat, were questioned by the police. Many stated that they heard some loud sounds coming from the flat, presumably an argument that lasted for several hours before the death of Lie. A neighbor also said that just the day before, Lie had informed her that she was going to be married and her boyfriend had proposed to her. Lie's family and friends, as well as neighbours and co-workers, described Lie as a quiet and friendly woman.

After the authorities completed their post-mortem examination, the body of Lie was returned to her family. An undertaker named Roland Tay agreed to help Lie's family to conduct the funeral, and he also installed prosthetic eyes on Lie's body. The bereaved family of Lie stated that they hoped Lie could reincarnate and lived a new life with new eyes for her to better judge people's character around her. Lie's father, a carpenter, expressed remorse for giving his daughter too much freedom when she said she wanted to move out, but the family were completely unaware that she had a boyfriend or that she was engaged. Lie's mother told the press that she had once advised her daughter to not accept the proposal given that her boyfriend was still in the middle of divorcing his wife.

On 1 April 2012, the suspect, identified as 37-year-old Gabriel Lee Haw Ling, was charged with murder. Four days later, on 5 April 2012, Lee was ordered by the district court to be held in remand for psychiatric evaluation for three weeks. On 26 April 2012, the remand order was extended by another two weeks. However, because Lee fell sick in prison, the court hearing to extend his psychiatric remand order was held on video-link.

== Background ==
Born in Singapore in 1988, Elsie Lie Lek Chee was the only daughter of Lie Yong Song and Chen Yoke Mooi, and had two younger brothers. She graduated from Fuhua Secondary School before enrolling into Jurong Junior College, but she dropped out during her second year. She went to work as an administrative officer at the Jurong Town Council, and later enrolled into a communications course at a local polytechnic.

Gabriel Lee Haw Ling was born in Singapore in 1975. He was formerly married to a Malaysian, who was a lawyer, and had two children. Lee's ex-wife reportedly described him as an irresponsible husband and father to his family and cited it as a reason for their divorce suit, although another source revealed that Lee became a stay-at-home husband to care for the children due to his ex-wife having greater income as a lawyer. In April 2011, while Lee was undergoing divorce proceedings, he and Lie first befriend each other on a social networking website and as they grew closer, Lee and Lie began to live together at a rented flat in Jurong West, which they shared with two to three foreign workers from Bangladesh. Initially, according to Lie's former boyfriend, when Lie first met Lee physically, she was upset that Lee lied to her about his age and marital status but she later continued the relationship as she and Lee loved each other.

Lee, who was a devout Catholic, strongly believed in spiritual possession and ghosts. According to a psychiatrist, as a result of a gradual but emerging psychiatric condition, starting from December 2011, Lee began to believe that the rented flat he shared with Lie was haunted, and furthermore, he also believed that Lie was possessed, and hence Lie carried a Bible everywhere she went and also taken to a Catholic church by Lee, undergoing an exorcism at one point.

== Account and motive ==
The following was the official version of the murder of Elsie Lie Lek Chee, based on the confession of Gabriel Lee Haw Ling and other facts uncovered by investigations.

On 30 March 2012, a day after Gabriel Lee proposed to Elsie Lie during a holiday to Genting Highlands, they spent the night together at their rented room in Jurong West. Lie had a shower in the kitchen bathroom and Lee was inside to help her, but the couple remained in there for a long time, and from the room itself, one of the couple's flatmates heard Lee groaning and traces of loud conversations between them. At one point, a maid living nearby the flat heard Lee shouting, "Go back! Go back to the sky!" The couple's flatmates later witnessed Lee helping Lie out of the bathroom, and Lie appeared pale and physically weak.

Still, the groaning sounds continued on from the couple's room, and one of the flatmates, Muhammad Shahin Talukder, called the police, reporting that there was a dispute. Two policemen, one of whom was Sergeant Muhammad Suffian Suaini, arrived at the flat, where Lee told the police that he was arguing with Lie and Lie, who was seen lying on the bed and appeared weak, said she had just undergone an abortion. After telling the couple to keep the peace, Sergeant Suffian and his partner left the flat.

However, things took a turn for the worse as the sounds did not only recede, it only gotten worse. At around 6.30am the next morning, one of the couple's flatmates shockingly found bloodstains on the door of the couple's room, and Shahin, who was told of this finding, immediately called the police. As it turned out, Lee, who was said to be suffering from psychotic delusions due to a psychiatric disorder at this point, believed his fiancée was possessed and hence, he carried out an exorcism killing and killed 24-year-old Elsie Lie. After murdering Lie, Lee tried to decapitate her head by using multiple tools - including a broken hammer, a can opener, a pair of pruning shears and two pairs of scissors - but he failed to.

When the paramedics, led by Staff Sergeant Low Lye Leng, arrived at the flat, Lee was seen lying underneath the topless body of Lie, who was covered with blood. While the paramedics waited for police to arrive, Lee was trying to amputate Lie's right foot and also gouged out Lie's eyes before throwing them out through the window, believing he can be forgiven if he offered the eyes as sacrifice. Apart from that, he also held a yellow cross, groaning and chanting as he knelt over Lie's body and ignored the officers and paramedics. Lee was thereafter arrested at the scene of crime for murdering Lie. An autopsy found multiple injuries to Lie's head, neck and limbs, including an open wound measured 12 cm that went across her neck and also cut her spinal cord. A couple of bent metal spoons were found entangled around her hair.

== Trial of Gabriel Lee Haw Ling ==
On 23 February 2017, nearly five years after the murder of Elsie Lie Lek Chee, her fiancé Gabriel Lee Haw Ling was finally brought to trial for killing her back in 2012. By then, Lee's murder charge was reduced to culpable homicide not amounting to murder, also known as manslaughter in Singapore's legal context. Pre-trial psychiatric tests revealed that Lee was suffering from a brief psychotic disorder, and according to Dr Tejpal Singh, a psychiatrist who assessed Lee during his time in remand, the disorder was severe enough to impair Lee's mental responsibility at the time of the murder, although the accused was still able to know right from wrong. This prompted the reduction of Lee's murder charge to manslaughter on the grounds of diminished responsibility. The judicial sentence stipulated for manslaughter was either life imprisonment or up to 20 years in jail.

Lee pleaded guilty to the reduced charge on the first day of his trial at the High Court, and was accordingly convicted. The sentencing hearing of Lee was convened on the same day before Judicial Commissioner Pang Khang Chau of the High Court. Deputy Public Prosecutor (DPP) Hay Hung Chun and his colleague Kystle Chiang sought a jail term of at least 12 years, citing that Lee had "brutally and prematurely extinguished" the life of his fiancée, and the violence inflicted upon the deceased was appalling to say the least and that Lee had attempted to chop off the head and ankle of Lie, and Lee also gouged Lie's eyes out, which "left her no dignity in death".

Defence lawyers Sunil Sudheesan and Diana Ngiam, who both represented Lee, argued for nine to ten years' jail, highlighting that the law should not "make examples of mentally disordered accused persons who commit offences as a result of their psychiatric conditions" and Lee was remorseful of having killed the woman he loved and the pain of having committed such an act was in essence, an eternal punishment for him. Sudheesan described his client as a "heartbroken man who deserves one chance", and his psychiatric condition was in remission, and added that Lee was raised in a family with a "strong Catholic background" and has believed in ghosts and spiritual possession since his childhood years. Lee's older brother, who was a surgeon, also submitted an affidavit and promised to supervise his brother upon his release from prison. Further reports showed that Lee was in a state of remission since December 2014, although he still regularly take medication to keep his condition in check.

After receiving the submissions, on that same day, Judicial Commissioner Pang sentenced 42-year-old Gabriel Lee Haw Ling to ten years' imprisonment, which was the sentence proposed by the defence. No official reasons were given behind the sentence, which was backdated to Lee's date of remand on 1 April 2012. Since Lee maintained good behavior while serving time in prison, he would likely be released on parole in early 2019 after completing at least two-thirds of his sentence (equivalent to six years and eight months).

== Aftermath ==
A local author, Yeo Suan Futt, wrote a book titled Murder Most Foul: Strangled, Poisoned and Dismembered in Singapore in 2013. The case of Elsie Lie's murder was covered in the second chapter of the book.

In the aftermath of Gabriel Lee's sentencing in 2017, Elsie Lie's mother Chen Yoke Mooi spoke up in the media, stating that she was dissatisfied with the sentence, finding that the jail term of ten years was not enough for the brutal end her daughter met and burying her daughter was one of the saddest things for her as a parent. Chen also said that after finding out her daughter's relationship with Gabriel Lee, she immediately disapproved of their relationship due to the circumstances of how they met and bonded. Chen stated that the court hearing of Lee in February 2017 was the first time she ever laid eyes on her daughter's killer and preferred that he stayed in jail longer out of fear that he might come after her family, and she stated that she wanted justice for Lie, especially since she dreamt of Lie twice after her death, in which Lie wanted to seek justice for her death.

Similarly, one of Lie's brothers Jinn Chyau, then a businessman, expressed that his sister died an unjust death and found the punishment of ten years' jail too light for Lee. He stated that when he first heard about the murder at Jurong West on the radio back in 2012, he never realized the victim was his sister until the police arrived, which was a huge blow to him. Lie's brother also said when he came to the flat itself to conduct some religious rites to recall his sister's spirit, the horrific sight of bloodstains all over the murder scene traumatized him and he could never forget that. Therefore, he set up an online petition to the Attorney-General's Chambers, hoping that this could prompt an appeal for a higher sentence while he also agreed it was up to the courts to decide. There was no appeal filed against the sentence despite the petition.

Since then, Lee was assumed to be out of prison since 2019.

== See also ==
- List of major crimes in Singapore
