= Poh Yuan Nie =

Singaporean fugitive and ex-tutor convicted of cheating

- Police mugshot of Poh Yuan Nie
- Born: Poh Yuan Nie; 21 December 1965 (age 60); Singapore
- Other names: Owen Fu; Pony Poh
- Occupation: Private tutor
- Known for: Mastermind of an examination cheating scheme in 2016
- Relatives: Fiona Poh Min (niece)
- Status: At large
- Conviction: Cheating (27 counts)
- Criminal charges: Cheating (27 counts); 11 more counts of cheating, perverting justice and failure to declare change of address
- Penalty: Four years' imprisonment (not served)

Poh Yuan Nie (Note: Chinese: 傅媛聂; pinyin: Fù Yuánnìe) (born 21 December 1965), a.k.a. Pony Poh or Owen Fu, is a Singaporean fugitive listed on Interpol's international Red Notice list. The former principal of a tuition centre in Singapore, she was charged and convicted of masterminding and abetting several students to cheat in their O-level examinations in 2016. Poh had committed the crime with her niece and two other tutors, all of whom were charged and put on trial for their respective roles in the case.

Poh was found guilty and sentenced to four years in prison for the sophisticated cheating scheme, while Poh's remaining accomplices were jailed between two and three years for the crime, and Poh herself lost her appeal against the conviction and sentence. Poh, who was granted bail after sentencing, did not adhere to a court order to surrender in September 2022 to serve her jail term, and is suspected to have fled Singapore. An Interpol red notice was issued for her arrest; she remains at large as of July 2026.

== Personal life ==
Poh Yuan Nie was born in Singapore on 21 December 1965. Little is known about her childhood and education, except that she became a tuition teacher at one point after reaching adulthood and completing her education, and in her family, Poh had one niece, Fiona Poh Min, (Note: Chinese: 傅敏; pinyin: Fù Mǐn) who was born in 1987. By 2016, Poh became the principal of Zeus Education Centre, a now-defunct private tuition centre in Tampines.

Poh, who identified herself as a lesbian, entered a relationship with a 17-year-old student Tan Jia Yan, (Note: Chinese: 陈家燕; pinyin: Chén Jiāyàn) who all the while mistook Poh for a man. Poh maintained this relationship with Tan for seven years before they broke up in 2008, when Tan, who was months shy of graduating from university, discovered Poh two-timing with another female. Tan later became a permanent teacher at Poh's tuition centre, where she continued to look up to Poh as a mentor despite their break-up. Poh later dated another tuition teacher named Wong Mee Keow, who was the owner of another private tuition agency, where Poh used to work at before she eventually became the principal of Zeus, and they remained intimate until Poh's arrest in 2016 for conspiracy to help her students cheat in their national examinations.

In 2006, Poh was a suspect behind an alleged scam, where it involved Poh and two female Chinese agents arranging for two students from China being enrolled into a local secondary school after bypassing their entrance examinations, and when this was discovered, the police sought Poh's assistance for investigations but she could not be located, and Wong also denied twice that she knew Poh during police questioning in August and November 2006. The police investigations thus came to a standstill due to them unable to locate Poh for questioning, but the investigations were subsequently revived in 2015 and 2016.

== Criminal conduct ==
Between 19 and 24 October 2016, Poh Yuan Nie and three of the teachers – Fiona Poh, Tan, and Chinese national Feng Riwen (Note: Chinese: 冯日文; pinyin: Féng Rìwén) – conspired to help six Chinese students to cheat in their O-level examinations.

Prior to this scheme, a Chinese national Dong Xin approached Zeus Education Centre, asking Poh to provide tuition for six students from China and help them to pass the O-levels and enter local polytechnics. Dong had paid Poh a deposit of S$8,000 and an admission fee of S$1,000 per student, but the catch was, if the students failed, the money was to be fully refunded. After signing the contracts, Poh thus hatched a plan to help the six students cheat in their O-levels, and she oversaw the whole operation, in which Fiona, Feng and Tan were roped to help her carry out the plan, which was set to take place from 19 to 24 October. Additionally, Tan was reportedly paid S$3,000 every month, on top of $1,000 per student for providing them with lodgings.

A few hours before each examination, under Poh's directions, Tan, Fiona Poh and Feng provided the six Chinese students wearable Bluetooth devices, which were attached onto their bodies, and the students also put on a skin-coloured in-ear earphone before going into the exam centres, where they would take the paper as private candidates. The devices were also connected to the mobile phones that were concealed under the clothing of each student, who were told to wear thick clothes to better hide the phones.

Additionally, Tan and Fiona would register themselves as private candidates as well, and either of them sat for an exam paper with a phone concealed and attached to their chests. Tan or Fiona would use the video-calling application FaceTime to capture images of the exam paper for the remaining accomplices to see and work out the answers. Through individual phone calls, the answers were relayed to the students, who penned down the answers. Also, the students were told to cough if they cannot hear the answer clearly and the answer would be repeated back to them.

The six students were able to hide their tracks and complete three papers from 19 to 21 October, but on 24 October, the plan was exposed when an invigilator heard unusual electronic transmission sounds and voices coming from one of the six students during an English exam. The student was later summoned to the office, where he handed over his earphone and devices, and confessed to his participation in a cheating scheme devised by Poh. The reason behind the sounds was due to the malfunctioning of the student's earpiece when one of the tutors, Feng, called him in midst of his paper.

After the student came clean with the scheme, the police were contacted and subsequently, Poh and her associates were arrested and charged with multiple counts of cheating. They were also charged with obstructing the course of justice for allegedly trying to send one of the students back to China to avoid him from testifying against them. Wong Mee Keow, Poh's lover, was also implicated in the case since she tried to lie about her relationship with Poh and delete her photos during the investigation of the O-level cheating case, and her cover-up back in 2006 was also discovered by the police.

== Court proceedings ==
=== Conviction of Tan and Wong ===
On 16 April 2018, 31-year-old Tan Jia Yan was the first and to date, the sole member of the offenders to plead guilty to 27 charges of cheating. Tan's sentencing trial took place a year later on 15 April 2019, and she was sentenced to three years' imprisonment. In sentencing Tan, District Judge Kenneth Yap described the offences as one of undermining "the principle of meritocracy and Singapore’s reputation as an education hub." He accepted the prosecution's arguments that a sentence of three years was warranted rather than the defence's proposed 18-month jail term since the cheating scheme was an affront to the efforts of thousands of students who shed their blood, sweat and tears to excel in the O-levels and opposed their rights to equality and fairness, and it also gave the wrong impression that the rich could use money to buy exam results without going through the necessitated process to complete the papers. The prosecution also stated earlier in their submissions that the case showed a need for deterrence and demonstrate the outrage of the community, due to its damage over Singapore's reputation as an education hub and the international and local attention paid to this case.

As for 39-year-old Wong Mee Keow, who was not involved in the crime but had provided false information to police to shield her girlfriend during their investigations of Poh (both in 2006 and 2016), she was fined S$2,000 after being convicted of charges of providing fake information to the police.

=== Poh Yuan Nie's trial ===
Poh Yuan Nie, together with her niece and Feng Riwen, officially stood trial together at a district court on 17 April 2018 for 27 cheating charges against each of them. Peter Keith Fernando represented Poh, Peter Ong Lip Cheng represented Fiona and James Chai represented Feng. The prosecution was led by Deputy Public Prosecutors Vadivalagan Shanmuga and Cheng Yuxi, while the trial was presided over by District Judge Chay Yuen Fatt. The trio reportedly pleaded not guilty to the charges.

The six students were among the 21 witnesses summoned by the prosecution. The first was Chen Xiang, who testified that on the eve of his first exam, he and the other five Chinese students were told to come to the tuition centre early next morning to meet Poh, and when he did so, he only got wind of the cheating plot and was also provided with the devices on the same morning itself. Chen, who was 19 when he came to court, stated that he agreed to go along, mainly because his family had spent a lot to send him to Singapore and was also assured that he would not be caught red-handed. Chen stated he tried to call another student Chen Yi, who was the same student caught cheating at Tampines Secondary School, on 24 October but could not get through him, and subsequently gotten wind of Chen Yi being caught. Not only did Poh convert some money to 1,000 Chinese yuan for Chen Xiang, Tan booked him on a flight back to China. 17-year-old Zhou Zice, the second of six students to testify in court, testified that via the same means, he was given the answers during the science practical exam on 19 October, in spite of his poor grasp of English and his uncertainty of correctly transcribing the answers he received, and he confirmed that he was told to wear a jacket and thick clothing to hide the Bluetooth devices he had. Zhou, who first came to Singapore in 2015 with the hope of attending an International Baccalaureate (IB) course, revealed that he submitted a decoy phone before the exam, and afterwards carried out the plan with the help of tutors from Zeus, where he was referred to for lessons under recommendation of his Singapore-based guardian.

21-year-old Zhang Jinlu, who lived with his aunt in Singapore, stated that he first came to Zeus for English lessons after his aunt sent him to go there. He similarly testified about the scheme, and he said he was too scared and did not dare to speak up and voice his intention to not cheat. Zhang said that after having cheated for two days in a row, he was overcame by his conscience and never went to Zeus again after his aunt, who heard about the scheme and did not initially stop him to cheat, agreed to speak to his parents in China and decided to inform Zeus they wished to terminate Zhang's lessons there. Wang Fangfei, then 19, was the fourth to show up in court as a witness and she said that after her English exam on 24 October, the same date when Chen Yi was caught, she was directed by a female teacher of Zeus to delete all her phone conversations regarding the cheating plot, and Wang was also told to abort continuing to use the devices in a second phone call on the following day when she completed her Additional Mathematics exam, and in a third and final phone call, Wang was instructed to not sit for subsequent exams.

The fifth student Chen Yi, who was the student caught for cheating, also stated that after he informed Zeus that he had been caught, he was arranged to fly back to China to avoid being arrested by the police. 20-year-old Chen also stated that one of the defendants asked for his password so that she could remotely remove all the phone conversations from Singapore. The final student to take the stand was 20-year-old Xiao Junze, who gave a similar account like the others about the plot. The three invigilators, Stephens Gloria, Benin Sabu and Chiew Chan Ping, were also summoned as prosecution witnesses. Gloria was the one who caught Chen Yi cheating, and the remaining two, Benin and Chiew, were in the office when Chen Yi surrendered his devices and confessed to cheating with Poh's abetment. Tan, who was still in prison serving her jail term after pleading guilty, also appeared as a witness, even though the defence counsel of Poh tried to raise doubts over the validity of her evidence against Poh.

During the trial itself, Fiona Poh alleged that she did not give her statements voluntarily. She claimed that after her brother informed her that their mother was in custody, she went to the police station and was questioned by the investigating officer Stanley Chew, who allegedly banged the table and threatened Fiona to fess up, claiming that Fiona's mother was in the station for ten hours without food or water and even brought up the elderly woman's blood pressure. Also, Fiona even claimed that other officers either coerced her with threats or promises of leniency, but her claims were refuted by the police officers, who stated that no such incidents happened. Denying that she did so to destroy evidence, Fiona told the court that she disposed of her phone because it contained photos of an illegal pet, which was a pangolin, that she reared in the tuition centre, which had since gone defunct during the course of the trial. However, the district court ultimately found that there was a case for Fiona to answer, and the trio were called to give their defence at the close of the prosecution's case, but all the three accused elected to remain silent. The prosecution therefore urged the trial court to draw an adverse inference from the trio's choice to remain silent and saw it fit to determine their guilt.

=== Poh's conviction and sentence ===
On 7 July 2020, after a 20-day trial that dragged on for 18 months, District Judge Chay Yuen Fatt delivered his verdict. Having made due consideration in this case, District Judge Chay noted that the trio had chosen to remain silent when their defence were called, and hence he was legally bound to draw an adverse inference from their decision to remain silent. District Judge Chay stated that the prosecution's case went unrebutted due to the defendants remaining silent, and hence he found that the prosecution had proven their case beyond a reasonable doubt, and found each member of the trio accused guilty of all 27 counts of cheating. Although the three accused were allowed to remain out on bail (since their arrest), the sentencing trial of the trio was scheduled to take place on 21 August 2020, but it was later postponed.

On 16 September 2020, the sentencing verdict was issued for Poh and her two co-accused. 54-year-old Poh, being the mastermind of the scheme, was sentenced to four years in prison; 33-year-old Fiona was sentenced to three years' imprisonment; and 28-year-old Feng was sentenced to jail for two years and four months (equivalent to 28 months). In his sentencing remarks, District Judge Chay admonished the trio for having "scandalised" the education system of Singapore and causing great damage to the reputation of Singapore on a national level, and he thus sided with the prosecution and imposed the exact sentences sought by the prosecution for both Feng and Fiona, although the jail term he handed to Poh was four months short of the 52 months proposed by the prosecution.

At the time of sentencing, both Feng and Fiona had one pending charge of perverting the course of justice preferred against them, while Poh had another 11 charges pending in her case, including cheating, obstructing justice and failing to report a change in residence. A month later, Feng was spared from the charge of hindering justice after the prosecution applied for Feng to receive an official discharge amounting to an acquittal, which meant that Feng would not again be charged with the same offence.

== Appeal process ==
After their sentencing, Fiona Poh and Poh Yuan Nie, who both remained out on bail, appealed to the High Court against their conviction and sentence. On 18 October 2021, the High Court delivered an oral judgement and rejected the appeal of the Pohs, who later brought their case forward to the Court of Appeal, the highest court of the nation, although Poh Yuan Nie absconded while out on bail two months before the Court of Appeal made their final decision over her appeal.

On 21 November 2022, the Court of Appeal dismissed the final appeal of both Poh and Fiona. The three judges – Chief Justice Sundaresh Menon and two Judges of Appeal Judith Prakash and Steven Chong – stated that the prosecution did not necessarily need to prove that the convict intended to cause anyone to wrongfully lose or gain property in cases where the offender dishonestly concealed some facts for the sake of deception. The three judges also scrutinized four possible interpretations of the current law on cheating, and they accepted that the word “dishonest” describes the mental state of the accused when committing a cheating offence, and the crime itself was not restricted solely to cases where an offender intended to commit deception related to property. Hence, the Court of Appeal upheld the convictions and sentences of the duo, and rejected their appeals.

In the aftermath, in February 2023, Fiona was granted an acquittal for her final preliminary charge of perverting the course of justice, and instead, she was let off with a stern warning from the Attorney-General's Chambers. Fiona, along with Feng Riwen and Tan Jia Yan, were still incarcerated as of 2024.

== Disappearance and Interpol red notice ==
Before the outcome of her appeal, Poh Yuan Nie was issued a court order to surrender herself in September 2022 to begin her four-year sentence. However, Poh failed to appear in court to surrender herself, and it was thus suspected that Poh had absconded.

On 23 November 2022, merely a day after the dismissal of her appeal, a warrant of arrest was issued for Poh, who was still missing. Poh's lawyer Peter Keith Fernando discharged himself on the same day when the warrant of arrest was issued. Investigations revealed that Poh had most likely fled Singapore, and hence in December 2022, the prosecution sought a warrant of arrest outside Singapore's jurisdiction in order to apprehend Poh. The authorities also confirmed that they would apply to Interpol for a red notice against Poh.

On 26 January 2023, Interpol officially issued a red notice for Poh's arrest, and the Singapore Police Force also publicly appealed for any crucial information to assist them in tracing her whereabouts. The police also warned the public that anyone caught harbouring Poh would also face the full brunt of the law; the maximum punishment for harbouring a fugitive was five years' imprisonment and a fine under Singapore law.

In January 2025, it was revealed by the Parliament of Singapore that there were a total of 40 Singaporeans, including Poh, who were listed as fugitives on the Interpol Red Notice list. In total, 80 individuals linked to Singapore were on the list, and out of these individuals, Poh and four other Singaporeans (who were wanted for murder, robbery, kidnapping and cheating) were the only ones with their fugitive status made known to the general public.

As of 2025, Poh Yuan Nie remains on the run and she is still wanted by both Interpol and the Singaporean police. Her current whereabouts are not known.

== See also ==
- List of major crimes in Singapore
- List of fugitives from justice who disappeared
