= Nazeri Lajim =

Singaporean hanged in 2022 for drug trafficking

Nazeri bin Lajim
- An undated photo of Nazeri Lajim in his thirties
- Born: 1958; Singapore
- Died: 22 July 2022 (aged 64); Changi Prison, Singapore
- Status: Executed by hanging
- Criminal charge: Drug trafficking
- Penalty: Death

Nazeri bin Lajim (c. 1958 – 22 July 2022), full name Nazeri bin Lajim Hertslet, was a Singaporean drug trafficker. Prior to his arrest in April 2012, Nazeri went to prison several times for drug consumption and several other drug offences, and was said to be addicted to drugs at age 14. Nazeri and his Malaysian accomplice were both brought to trial and found guilty five years later on 8 August 2017.

While the accomplice was sentenced to life imprisonment and caning for being a courier, Nazeri was sentenced to death; the High Court found that he was not a courier and rejected his defence that most of the drug supply seized was for the purpose of his own consumption. Throughout the next five years, Nazeri lost his appeals against his sentence and twice failed to obtain a presidential pardon. On 22 July 2022, the day after he failed to overturn his sentence for the final time, 64-year-old Nazeri was hanged at Changi Prison.

== Background and case ==
=== Personal life ===
Nazeri bin Lajim was born in 1958. He, his younger sister Nazira (born in 1960) and nine other siblings were born to a British father and Malay mother. Their father, who served as an administrator in the colonial British army, originally provided the family with a good income and fairly affluent life until the 1970s, when he lost his job as a result of the British Army removing all of its troops in Singapore. Nazeri's father initially planned to relocate to London to continue his tenure in the British army, but Nazeri's mother refused to leave Singapore due to her inability to communicate in English. As a result of Nazeri's father losing his job, the family fortunes declined greatly, and it took a toll on the health of Nazeri's father, who suffered a stroke and later died at age 45 the same year Nazeri was 18.

The financial problems and death of her husband led to Nazeri's mother, who used to be a housewife, to take on multiple jobs to take care of her eleven children, who all eventually had to fend for themselves, and some of them went to live in Malaysia. Nazeri was also physically abused frequently by his eldest brother. Due to his mother's negligence and lack of parental care and attention, Nazeri, who had only a primary school education, began to stay away from home more often and was addicted to drugs when he was 14. It led to him going in and out of prison frequently for nearly three-quarters of his life. He reportedly did not receive much rehabilitation behind bars despite the help given to him.

Nazeri was married sometime in the 1990s and fathered a son in 1998. However, the couple divorced as a result of Nazeri's drug addiction and frequent imprisonment. Still, despite the divorce, Nazeri's ex-wife still loved him, and he maintained a close relationship with his ex-wife, son and step-daughter.

=== Drug trafficking trial ===
On 13 April 2012, 54-year-old Nazeri bin Lajim was busted and caught red-handed for drug trafficking at Far East Shopping Centre in Orchard Road. His accomplice, a 24-year-old Malaysian named Dominic Martin Fernandez, was also arrested at another location after he went separate ways with Nazeri at the end of their delivery. In Dominic's possession, a brown envelope that he was carrying was seized and found to contain cash totaling about S$10,400. After searching Nazeri's sling bag, officers of the Central Narcotics Bureau (CNB) recovered two black-taped bundles which contained about 960g of heroin, which were estimated to have a street worth of S$144,000. A straw of heroin and a small flip-knife were also discovered inside the bag. Later, the drugs were weighed and a total of 33.89g of diamorphine (pure heroin) were discovered. Nazeri's trial took place three years later on 11 August 2015.

After he was caught and charged, Nazeri did not deny knowing that he had heroin in his possession, and he admitted that he ordered the drugs from a man named Kumar, who asked Dominic to deliver the drugs to him. However, Nazeri stated that he did not intend to traffick all of the heroin. He stated that he wanted to sell only about 13.318g of the diamorphine (the amount was below the minimum threshold of 15g that warrant the death penalty), while the rest were meant for his own consumption. He also claimed he meant to order only one bundle from Kumar but not the two bundles he received from Dominic (who similarly confessed to his role in the crime).

However, Nazeri's testimony contained conflicting versions as he told police he would normally take five bundles during every delivery while he told his defence psychiatrist and the court that he took twelve bundles. Nazeri's defence was thus rejected by the High Court, which found him guilty of drug trafficking after determining that it was more likely Nazeri intended for most of the drugs to be sold while keeping only a small amount for his own use, and deemed his testimony of selling only 13.318g of the drugs unreliable and untruthful.

Since Nazeri failed to satisfy the requirements of a courier and was not assessed with any mental illnesses, he was sentenced to death by Senior Judge Kan Ting Chiu on 8 August 2017, two years after the beginning of his trial. Nazeri's appeal against his sentence was dismissed by the Court of Appeal on 4 July 2018. It was revealed in 2022 that Nazeri's first clemency petition was dismissed on 10 July 2019, the same date when twelve other prisoners (including Gobi Avedian and Datchinamurthy Kataiah) also lost their appeals for clemency.

On the same day of Nazeri's sentencing, Justice Kan also found Dominic guilty of the same crime. But he sentenced Dominic to life imprisonment and 15 strokes of the cane (with his sentence backdated to the date of his arrest and the possibility of parole after 20 years) since Dominic was acting as a drug courier and had cooperated with the authorities to render substantive assistance to disrupt drug trafficking activities. Dominic did not appeal and is currently serving his sentence at Changi Prison.

== Subsequent lawsuits ==
=== 2021 case review application ===
In March 2021, Nazeri engaged human rights lawyer M Ravi to submit an application to re-open the case. Nazeri re-used his defence that he only meant to keep most of the drugs for his consumption and even added that prior to his capture, he wanted to return the second bundle after receiving it. He even prepared a psychiatric report to support his contention, and his former lawyer James Masih also admitted in another source that he overlooked certain matters during the trial that would have aided Nazeri's defence. The appeal however, was denied on 20 April 2021, as the judge Tay Yong Kwang found that there was sufficient evidence to prove Nazeri's guilt even with the shortcomings of Nazeri's former lawyer in the trial and appeal, and found that Nazeri's claims and new evidence should not be relied on due to the lack of credibility and its inconsistency with other trial evidence in Nazeri's case.

=== Lawsuit over forwarding of letters ===
After the loss of his appeal, Nazeri and 21 other death row prisoners filed a lawsuit against the Attorney-General of Singapore. The lawsuit was about allegations that the private letters between the death row inmates and both their lawyers and families were being forwarded to the Attorney General's Chambers (AGC) by the prison authorities, and it led to Nazeri and the others bringing forward the lawsuit against the AGC for alleged breaches of conduct to protect the inmates' rights, misconduct in public office and seeking damages for any harm caused by such.

The lawsuit was dismissed on 16 March 2021. High Court judge See Kee Oon ruled that it may be allowed for prisons to make copies of the inmates' correspondence for screening and recording letters, they were not allowed to forward them to the AGC. Unless a prisoner consented so, the AGC will be denied access to these sources. However, the judge said that such a procedure was not the AGC's intention to take advantage over court proceedings but a negligence on their part.

=== Racial discrimination lawsuit ===
In August 2021, an appeal was made by 17 Malay death row inmates, including Nazeri himself, against their death sentences on basis of alleged racist discrimination. It was revealed that between 2010 and 2021, Malays made up 66 of the 120 prosecutions for drug trafficking, where over 76% of them were sentenced to death. 50 out of 77 people sentenced to death between 2010 and 2021 were revealed to be Malays. Nazeri and the 16 other prisoners thus argued that the death penalty was discriminatory in nature when it comes to the different racial backgrounds of suspects facing capital charges based on the alleged "over-representation" of minorities (especially the Malays) on Singapore's death row. However, the appeal was dismissed on 2 December 2021 because there was no evidence to prove that these said inmates were treated differently due to their race, and these allegations would put the integrity of the law at stake and thus should be considered as an abuse of the court processes. The lawyers M Ravi and Cheng Kim Kuan were ordered to pay S$10,000 in costs of the lawsuit.

== Final appeal process ==
=== Clemency petition and death warrant ===
In May 2022, with the support of activists, Nazeri's family filed a second plea for clemency, but the petition was once again dismissed. Nazeri's 62-year-old younger sister Nazira stated that during her brother's imprisonment, she kept visiting her brother regularly but she feared that any of the visits she made could be her last. She stated that while she knew her brother's execution would highly likely be carried out, she still held on to hope and the case had made her decide to advocate for the death penalty to be abolished.

On 15 July 2022, Nazeri's family received his death warrant, which states that Nazeri's execution was scheduled to take place on 22 July 2022. Nazeri's execution warrant came just eight days after the double hangings of Norasharee Gous and Kalwant Singh Jogindar Singh on 7 July 2022.

Nazeri's family (most prominently his sister Nazira) appealed for clemency. They also gathered together with the loved ones of ten other death row inmates to submit a petition with over 400 signatures to urge the Singapore government to abolish the death penalty. They hoped that the members of Parliament could view the issue of capital punishment more seriously due to its impact on families and its alleged ineffectiveness to deter crime. Nazeri's 24-year-old son, ex-wife and sister Nazira were interviewed and they hoped that mercy could be given to Nazeri.

Not only there were appeals for clemency in his case, the scheduling of Nazeri's execution brought attention and debate to the alleged racial makeup of Singapore's death row where most of the drug convicts were Malay. At that time, the Singapore government was facing the international pressure to not use the death penalty on drugs, but the government maintained that the death penalty was an effective deterrent and necessary punishment to deploy against serious crimes in Singapore, with over 80% of the population in Singapore supporting the use of capital punishment for murder and drug trafficking. The calls for abolition only intensified since March 2022 till Nazeri's death warrant, when the Singapore government authorized four executions (including Abdul Kahar Othman and Nagaenthran K. Dharmalingam) after a two-year moratorium on all hangings due to the COVID-19 pandemic. Also, the decision of Singapore to resume executions at the time Malaysia and Thailand decided to relax their approach on penalties for drug crimes brought more attention to the opposition of Singapore's death penalty laws.

=== Final appeal ===
On 19 July 2022, three days before he was due to hang, Nazeri filed another appeal to seek a stay of execution, but the High Court dismissed his application the next day.

On 21 July 2022, the eve of his execution, Nazeri submitted his final appeal to the Court of Appeal in a last-minute bid to escape the gallows. Nazeri, who represented himself via a video-link in Zoom, requested a deferment of between one and two weeks to allow him to engage legal representation. He also sought a court order that his capital charge was "arbitrarily imposed" and it thus violated his constitutional rights, and also sought a stay of execution pending court proceedings. He also argued his prosecution was unconstitutional by citing several cases of other offenders initially charged with importing drugs above the capital threshold, but later convicted of non-capital charges. He also added that some of his siblings and relatives had not visited him for the final time and he needed a bit more time. Senior State Counsel Anandan Bala and State Counsels Chan Yi Cheng and Rimplejit Kaur argued that there was no merit to Nazeri's appeal and it was an example of "drip-feeding" applications to prevent the law from taking its course, and stated that it was flawed for Nazeri to argue that all offenders who trafficked various quantities of drugs that were below and above the capital threshold should be given the same treatment.

In the end, the three Judges of Appeal Andrew Phang, Tay Yong Kwang and Belinda Ang unanimously rejected Nazeri's appeal, as they found the application "entirely devoid of factual basis" and dismissed it as an abuse of the court's process, which also did not warrant the need to adjourn the hearing for Nazeri to find legal representation. They upheld that the charges against an alleged drug offender were not merely based on the amount of drugs possessed, but also various other factors like personal circumstances, the sufficiency of evidence and the willingness of a suspect to testify against a co-accused, which would inevitably create possible but reasonable situations of offenders involved in the same crime get prosecuted differently. The judges also noted that Nazeri filed his appeal for a stay of execution, but it was done four days after he received his death warrant, and therefore, it was time-barred, or submitted way out of time. This also meant it was submitted past the acceptable window period and there was no reason to submit it at such a late timing. Justice Phang, who pronounced the verdict, cited the High Court's decision, "There is simply 'no substratum of fact to support a real possibility of relief being granted.'"

Nazeri's former lawyer M Ravi tried to postpone his execution by calling Nazeri as a witness in a disciplinary probe against him, but the application was dismissed. As a result, Nazeri's execution would still be carried out as scheduled.

The Central Narcotics Bureau also made a press release to clarify that there was no miscarriage of justice in Nazeri's case to rebut the untrue allegations over his case. They stated that Nazeri was accorded full due process under the law and had exhausted all his appeals before the sentence was finalized, and the 33.89g of diamorphine carried by Nazeri is sufficient to feed the addiction of about 400 abusers for a week. They ended off with their statement that Singapore only deployed capital punishment for the most serious of crimes, including the trafficking of significant amounts of drugs which would inflict serious harm to the addicts and their families, as well as the whole society in general, for which the death penalty was an effective and relevant measure among the ones used to tackle drug problems in Singapore.

== Execution ==
On 22 July 2022, Nazeri was hanged at dawn inside Changi Prison, thus becoming the fifth death row convict to be executed during the COVID-19 pandemic in Singapore. According to activist Kokila Annamalai, Nazeri's family reclaimed his remains from the prison, and there would be funeral prayers held at Masjid Assyakirin in Taman Jurong. Nazeri's remains were arranged for burial in the Muslim cemetery at Masjid Al-Firdaus. The Singapore Prison Service (SPS) confirmed to AFP in an email statement that Nazeri's capital sentence was carried out as scheduled. Nazira added that her brother looked peaceful and accepted his fate prior to the execution.

Another Singaporean, a 49-year-old ethnic Malay who was one of the 17 plaintiffs in Nazeri's racial bias lawsuit, was executed for a 2015 drug trafficking offence four days after Nazeri was hanged.

In the year 2022 itself, a total of eleven executions, including Nazeri's, had been officially carried out in Singapore, all for drug offences.

== Case reactions and aftermath ==
Amnesty International condemned the Singapore government for executing Nazeri, saying his execution and four previous hangings during the previous four months "only show the utter disregard the Singaporean authorities have for human rights and the right to life." Chiara Sangorgio, the death penalty expert of the group, called on other international groups to continue to put pressure on Singapore to abolish the death penalty, and urged Singapore to put a stop to all its upcoming executions for the remaining 60 prisoners on Singapore's death row.

Kirsten Han, a human rights activist, showed her opposition to the execution and stated that there should be more compassion and attention given to the drug convicts on death row to allow them to have second chances to rehabilitate rather than resorting to execution. She commented in her own words, "Instead, he was punished with incarceration over and over again throughout his life." The European Union also expressed their criticism of Nazeri's execution and stated that the Singapore government should stop their planned series of executions and revive its moratorium to work towards the eventual goal of total abolition of capital punishment. Kokila Annamalai also posted on social media a final photo of Nazeri taken before his execution and offered condolences to his bereaved family. Aside from their condemnation of execution, the United Nations also criticized Singapore's use of the death penalty for drugs and stated it was not in accordance to the international standards of the use of capital punishment.

In August 2022, a news report revealed that due to the case of Nazeri and several others (notably Nagaenthran K. Dharmalingam), there were discussions among Singaporeans about the need for compassion for some death row inmates, since there were increasing citations by activists the cases of some drug traffickers who came from low-income families or having drug addictions before ending up on death row. However, despite the increased awareness, the public remains supportive of capital punishment for drugs, given that there were rampant rates of drug trafficking at the Golden Triangle in Southeast Asia, the effectiveness of the death penalty in maintaining Singapore's low crime rate and the devastating impact drugs had on the addicts and their families.

In April 2023, in light of Malaysia's abolition of the mandatory death sentence for murder, drug trafficking and all other capital offences, Nazeri's sister Nazira stated that while this move would possibly allow Singaporeans to rethink on the validity of capital punishment in their society, she doubted that this would allow the government to budge on their stance towards the death penalty in Singapore. At this point, Nazira still harboured grief and anger over the death of her brother from eight months before, calling the government "cruel" for executing her brother without heeding to the numerous appeals for mercy on Nazeri's life. In October of the same year, before the World Day Against the Death Penalty, Nazira was one of the 1,700 people, all of whom were families of death row prisoners (including those who were executed), who signed a petition to the government to impose a moratorium on executions and conduct a review of the death penalty.

When CNN covered the topic of Singapore's death penalty in October 2024, Nazira was approached for an interview, and while she expressed her outrage and grief over her brother's execution and the need to repeal the death penalty, she had been encouraging her adult children to leave Singapore permanently to emigrate to Australia, likely influenced by Nazeri's execution.

== See also ==
- Capital punishment in Singapore
- List of major crimes in Singapore
