= Killing of Wong Chik Yeok =

2016 murder of an elderly woman

Wong Chik Yeok
- Wong Chik Yeok, who was found dead with 189 knife wounds
- Born: Wong Chik Yeok c. 1953; Colony of Singapore
- Died: 13 March 2016 (aged 63); Compassvale, Seng Kang, Singapore
- Cause of death: Acute hemorrhage by multiple incised wounds
- Occupation: Housewife
- Known for: Murder victim
- Spouse: Kong Peng Yee (m. 1980; her killer)
- Children: 2

On 13 March 2016, at their flat in Compassvale Crescent, Seng Kang, Singapore, 63-year-old Wong Chik Yeok (黄池玉 Huáng Chíyù) was slashed and stabbed to death by her 68-year-old husband Kong Peng Yee (江炳义 Jiāng Bǐngyì) with a cleaver and knife. Kong, who was arrested and charged with murder, was revealed to have suffered from a brief psychotic episode as a result of severe psychotic delusions, which caused him to believe that his wife and daughters wanted to harm him. He then decided to make a pre-emptive strike by killing his wife, who sustained 189 injuries as a result of the attack. Kong's original charge of murder was reduced to manslaughter a year later on the grounds of diminished responsibility, and after pleading guilty in September 2017, Kong was sentenced to two years jail in October 2017. After the prosecution's appeal, Kong's sentence was increased to six years imprisonment, in June 2018.

== Killing and arrest ==
In the late afternoon of 13 March 2016, Kong called his younger daughter and informed her that he had killed his wife and the daughter made a police report requesting help. The police arrived shortly after the report and found Wong lying in a pool of blood in the unit, and she was pronounced dead by paramedics at 5:00pm (SGT). Kong, who was at home, was questioned by the police and was arrested as a suspect. He was then sent to the hospital for treatment of his injuries.

Many neighbors were shocked to hear that Wong was killed, and they all noted that Wong and her husband were a loving couple, and they often went out together for breakfast in the mornings. The neighbors said they did not hear any commotion before the victim was killed, and there were no arguments coming from the flat. During preliminary investigations, the police were unable to find a motive, given that Wong's family was harmonious and close-knit and there were no known conflicts arising between them, and the couple's two daughters (who both worked as teachers) were filial and obedient.

On 14 March 2016, Kong was charged with murder during his hospitalization at Changi General Hospital. Under Singaporean law, Kong would be sentenced to death if he was found guilty of murder. Kong was also remanded in prison and ordered to undergo psychiatric evaluation until 5 April 2016.

== Background ==
Kong Peng Yee
- Born: Kong Peng Yee; 1948 (age 77–78); Colony of Singapore
- Occupation: Aircraft technician (retired)
- Spouse: Wong Chik Yeok (m. 1980)
- Children: 2
- Status: Released since 2020
- Motive: Unknown, but due to psychotic delusions
- Conviction: Manslaughter (one count)
- Criminal charge: 1st charge: Murder of Wong Chik Yeok
- Penalty: Six years' imprisonment

After his arrest in 2016, Kong confessed to the police that he was responsible for murdering his wife.

Background information revealed that Kong, a retired aircraft technician who used to work at Changi Airport, was married to Wong for 36 years and had two daughters (aged 27 and 36 respectively in 2016), and at the time of the offence, Kong lived together with his wife and younger daughter at their flat in Compassvale Crescent while their elder daughter, who was married, lived elsewhere in Singapore. The couple were reportedly married on 15 June 1980.

In January 2016, two months before the murder, Kong had cataract surgery on his right eye, and as a result of the surgery, Kong began to suffer mild physical impairments, such as constipation and insomnia. According to a psychiatric report of Dr Kenneth Koh, who assessed Kong during his psychiatric remand, Kong began to develop severe depression and it began to cause him to experience psychotic delusions. Despite seeking medical attention for those ailments, Kong refused to take any medication and for instance, he refused to take laxatives, believing that it was "poisonous" as a result of the delusions that arose since the surgery. When his wife and younger daughter gave him prune juice as a remedy for constipation, Kong erroneously believed they were trying to "torture" him.

On 12 March 2016, the day before he killed his wife, Kong went for a medical appointment, and although the results did not come out adversely, Kong continued to be worried about his health and believed he may be suffering from an illness and might die, or thinking that someone would harm him. Additionally, Kong exhibited strange behavior and he appeared troubled, telling his older daughter to care for her sister if he was no longer alive. Kong even told his eldest that she was not his daughter, although it was not ascertained if this was true or not. Additionally, the next day, when he went to a church with his older daughter, Kong said a lot of strange things, and he told a pastor out of the blue that God had wanted him to return his daughter to the rightful parent. Also, during a sermon, Kong told a stranger sitting beside him that there were people who had been poisoning him. After the church session, Kong and his family returned home to their flat, and later, Kong's elder daughter left the flat to pick up her sister. Kong and his wife remained at home, and he went to take a nap while Wong rested in the living room.

During his sleep, Kong suddenly woke up, and he claimed in his statements that he heard some "roaring sounds" that made him wake up. He walked to the kitchen and got a knife from the sink, and upon seeing his wife folding clothes, Kong attacked her from behind and stabbed her, before he moved to her front and repeatedly stabbed her a second time. Wong put up a struggle with her husband, who dropped the knife, but Kong was undeterred, and he returned to the kitchen to grab a cleaver and started hacking his wife until she died. Partly due to his psychiatric condition, Kong claimed he heard voices in his head, telling him to make sure that his wife was dead, and upon realizing that Wong had indeed died, Kong stopped the attack and reportedly felt "happy" about Wong's death. According to an autopsy report by Dr Chan Shijia, she found a total of 189 injuries on Wong's body, and most of these wounds were concentrated on Wong's head. Dr Chan certified in her report that Wong had died as a result of massive blood loss from the multiple incised wounds on her head.

After killing Wong, Kong called both his sister and younger daughter, informing them that he had killed his wife, and he also wrote on a piece of paper how his assets should be distributed. Kong's daughters, who called the police, rushed back home and found their father sitting on the sofa and their mother lying in a pool of blood. Shortly after, the police arrived and Kong was arrested.

== Kong's trial and sentencing ==
=== Plea of guilt and submissions ===
On 8 September 2017, Kong, who was then 69 years old, stood trial at the High Court before Justice Choo Han Teck for the killing of Wong. The psychiatric reports from Dr Kenneth Koh certified that Kong was suffering from diminished responsibility as a result of his psychotic delusions. The prosecution agreed to reduce the murder charge to a lesser charge of culpable homicide not amounting to murder, which was equivalent to manslaughter, and Kong no longer face the death penalty for killing his wife. Kong pleaded guilty to the reduced charge on the same day he stood trial, and was convicted of the killing. The charge of manslaughter attracts a sentence of either life imprisonment or up to 20 years' jail, in addition to a possible fine or caning.

The prosecution, led by Tan Wen Hsien, sought a sentence of nine years' imprisonment. They argued that Kong had acted with "senseless brutality" and callously snuffed out the life of his wife, who was utterly defenseless against her husband, who was "relatively unscathed by the savage attack while she suffered a colossal 189 injuries", and a harsh and deterrent sentence was called for in view of the circumstances. Kong's defense counsel, Diana Ngiam and Sunil Sudheesan, pressed for a jail term of five years. They urged the court to consider that in spite of the importance of protecting the public and retribution, Kong's psychiatric condition was the direct cause of his actions, and he was in remission due to consistent treatment behind bars. Kong's lawyers also pointed out that Kong was "wrought with sorrow and remorse" for killing his wife under his psychotic delusions.

Sentencing was adjourned to a later date, after Justice Choo stated he wished to inquire Dr Koh further on the psychiatric condition of Kong. In Dr Koh's reports, he certified that Kong responded well to medication and entered into remission, and due to the good prognosis and advanced age of Kong, his mental state would remain stable as long as Kong received consistent treatment and medication, and he exhibited a low risk of re-offending. Kong, who did not have a past history of violence, substance abuse and imprisonment, also had good familial support, since his family members continued to visit him and his daughters were willing to take care of him once he came out of prison, and they had forgiven him for killing their mother the year before.

=== Kong's sentence and release ===
On 16 October 2017, a sentencing trial was carried out. n his full grounds of decision, Justice Choo found that it was inappropriate to sentence Kong to nine years' jail, because in his case, punishment was not the most appropriate response to Kong's actions, which had occurred as a result of his psychiatric condition, which severely impaired his mental responsibility at the time of the murder. He disagreed that deterrence and retribution should be prioritized on the grounds that Kong's condition was in a state of remission and he was certified safe to return to his family, and the offence was committed by Kong while he was "guided by thoughts that entered unbidden into his mind".

Stating that "his (Kong's) madness was its own punishment", Justice Choo stated that the problem originated from "an archaic law that has been incorporated into our statute", referring to the M'Naghten rules, a landmark legal test laid down by a 19th-century English case which declared a man not to be insane if he either knew what he was doing or that what he was doing was wrong. Justice Choo stated that language of the M'Naghten rules should be re-examined, because with the application of the M'Naghten rules, "legal insanity and medical insanity have not fitted themselves snugly in the same box" and it disregarded the fact that there were multiple varieties of mental illnesses which could lead to an abnormality of mind, and the extent of impairment of the mental faculties were not the same for all illnesses. From this, Justice Choo stated that all "doctors and lawyers should speak a common language" when dealing with the actions of a mentally ill criminal who was who was labouring under a mental illness at the time of the offence. Having considered all the relevant factors to decide on Kong's sentence, Justice Choo felt that leniency should be exercised, and it was not a case where retributive justice should take precedence in the sentencing of Kong.

69-year-old Kong was sentenced to two years' imprisonment, which was one of the lightest sentences ever meted out for intentional manslaughter in Singapore's legal history. As he was more than 50 years of age at the time of sentencing, Kong was spared the cane. Since the sentence was backdated to 13 March 2016, the date of Kong's remand, and Kong had also served his time with good behavior, which would warrant a one-third remission of the overall sentence (equivalent to 16 months in Kong's case), Kong was granted parole and therefore released on the same day he was sentenced.

According to Sudheesan, Kong's family members were surprised by the two-year jail term handed to Kong, who was allowed to have a brief moment with his family after the end of his sentencing hearing. The prosecution confirmed on the same day that they would appeal against Kong's sentence.

== Prosecution's appeal ==
=== Appeal ===
On 22 January 2018, three months after the sentencing of Kong Peng Yee, the prosecution's appeal was brought forward for hearing at the Court of Appeal. During the hearing, the prosecution argued that Kong's sentence of two years in prison was inadequate and instead, he should be jailed for at least nine years. Deputy Public Prosecutors (DPPs) Tan Wen Hsien, Sarah Shi and Daphne Lim submitted that the original trial judge had placed undue weight on Kong's mental condition and failed to accord due weight to his awareness of his actions and the knowledge that his acts were wrongful. They stated that the two-year prison term should not be upheld, as it would be a case where the ends of justice was not fulfilled despite the extremely brutal and vicious manner of Wong Chik Yeok's death.

It was further revealed by Kong's lawyer Sunil Sudheesan that Kong's family members were still dealing with the trauma of losing Wong and that Kong's daughters were not fully ready to accept their father at this point of time given the unexpected length of Kong's imprisonment and later release. Also, after Kong was released in October 2017, he did not return home and instead voluntarily admitted himself as a patient at the Institute of Mental Health (IMH) where he continued to accept treatment. Kong's daughters and other family members continued to visit him at the IMH.

The Court of Appeal adjourned their decision to a later date after indicating they needed more time to look through further psychiatric evidence to determine the degree of prospects of recovery and possible risks of a relapse in Kong's case. Kong reportedly expressed to the court that he was willing to remain in the IMH pending the outcome of the prosecution's appeal.

=== Appeal outcome ===
On 27 June 2018, the Court of Appeal's three-judge panel - consisting of Chief Justice Sundaresh Menon, Justice Judith Prakash and Justice Tay Yong Kwang - delivered their verdict. Justice Tay, who pronounced the judgement in court, stated that they accepted the prosecution's contention that sending Kong to prison for two years was too light a punishment, but Justice Tay referred to the psychiatric reports and noted that Kong's condition was in remission due to consistent treatment and he was unlikely to re-offend as long as his mental state remained stable, and the panel agreed that Kong had a good insight of his condition and he had strong familial support, as his family was more aware of his condition and better equipped in supervising and caring for him.

Justice Tay also disagreed with the prosecution that the principles of deterrence and retribution should be prioritized when deciding on Kong's sentence, as they found this principle "should not be a dominant consideration" during sentencing, given that the psychosis was "causally linked to the offence and warped his understanding of reality", and the emphasis on retribution should not be as high, because in spite of Kong's merciless and violent attack on his wife, the brutality of the killing arose from the workings of a "disordered mind rather than a cold and cruel one". Rather, Justice Tay pronounced on behalf of the judges that rehabilitation and prevention should be prioritized over deterrence and retribution, so as to rehabilitate Kong and prevent him from harming others around him.

The appellate court also duly considered various potential sentencing options before arriving at their decision. The first option was to dismiss the prosecution's appeal and order that Kong be detained for psychiatric treatment under the Mental Health (Care and Treatment) Act if he ever had a relapse in the future. The second option was to sentence Kong to undergo probation at IMH (Institute of Mental Health [Singapore]). A third was to allow the prosecution's appeal and increase the jail term. However, the first and second options were not chosen, because for the first choice, it was unsatisfactory due to Kong having the freedom to leave IMH on his own accord and there would be no assurance that he would continue to take his medication. The second was not chosen because probation was generally reserved for less serious offences and aimed to fulfill the purpose of rehabilitating young offenders in need of guidance and discipline.

After due consideration, the appellate court decided that Kong should be incarcerated for a longer period than two years, and his sentence should be increased for the sake of public interest. Before enhancing Kong's sentence, the judges emphasized that this was not done out of a need to punish Kong, but to rehabilitate him and prevent him from harming others, and ensure that he committed himself with strict compliance to his medication before he returned to society in the near future. Despite their decision, the judges did not agree to impose nine years' jail as what the prosecution sought for Kong.

In conclusion, the appellate court allowed the prosecution's appeal and hence re-sentenced 70-year-old Kong Peng Yee to six years imprisonment. In the joint verdict, Justice Tay quoted their reason to commit Kong to jail for six years:

"We think a sentence of six years will also assuage, to a reasonable degree, any concerns that the public might have about a potentially dangerous man living in its midst, especially someone who killed his wife of more than three decades in a most brutal and violent manner only slightly more than two years ago."

Additionally, the Court of Appeal ordered the jail term to commence from the date of Kong's arrest, and taking into account the usual one-third remission for good behavior, the jail term could potentially be reduced to four years. Furthermore, Kong had already spent one year and seven months behind bars prior to his sentencing and subsequent release in 2017, and taking into account the time spent in prison before the appeal hearing, Kong would only need to serve another two years and five months in prison before he could be granted parole and released for good behavior.

In November 2020, Kong was released from Changi Prison.

== See also ==
- List of major crimes in Singapore
