= 2019 Toa Payoh chopper attack =

2019 chopper murder of a 79-year-old woman by her domestic partner in Singapore

Lim Soi Moy
- Lim Soi Moy, who was hacked to death by her partner
- Born: Lim Soi Moy c. 1939; Singapore, Straits Settlements
- Died: 1 September 2019 (aged 79); Toa Payoh, Singapore
- Other name: Lim Kim Luan
- Occupations: Kitchen assistant (retired); Hawker (former); Bus interchange food seller (former)
- Employer: McDonald's
- Known for: Murder victim
- Partner: Pak Kian Huat (her killer)
- Children: Two sons and two daughters

On 1 September 2019, at a four-room flat in Toa Payoh, 82-year-old Pak Kian Huat (白建发 Bái Jiànfā), alias Pek Kiah Huat, brandished a chopper and attacked his longtime domestic partner Lim Soi Moy (林细妹 Lín Xìmèi), and inflicted a total of 54 injuries on 79-year-old Lim, who died as a result. According to sources, Pak, who first met Lim in the 1950s and had four children with her even though they did not marry, had been unhappy with Lim refusing to let him move into a bigger bedroom and this made him become angry and thus used the chopper on Lim. Pak, who was charged with murder after his arrest, was eventually convicted of manslaughter after reaching a plea bargain, and in May 2023, Pak was sentenced to 15 years' imprisonment for the "vicious and brutal" killing of Lim.

== Murder investigation ==
On 1 September 2019, at a four-room flat in Toa Payoh, an 82-year-old man was arrested for the alleged murder of his 79-year-old female flatmate,

The police were alerted at about 3:40 am and arrived at the flat, where they apprehended the man as a suspect. The victim, identified as Lim Soi Moy (also spelt as Lim Soy Moi), was said to have resided in the flat for about 20 years and the suspect was her long-time domestic partner, even though the couple did not register their marriage. Lim's 86-year-old neighbour Goh Leng Sim told the press that she often met the victim during her morning exercise, but did not see the pair together, and she knew that the pair had four children, who all did not live together with them. Another neighbour also said the pair were often heard bickering with each other but it was nothing unusual. Many neighbours were also shocked to hear that a violent murder happened in their block, and one of them stated he was awakened by multiple sounds coming from the flat and he was surprised to see police officers arriving and cordoning off the flat. An autopsy report later showed that Lim suffered a total of 54 injuries, including 31 on her face, and these were inflicted with great force using a chopper, and bruises and fractures were also discovered all over the body. Lim died as a result of massive blood loss from the multiple injuries she sustained.

On 2 September 2019, the suspect, identified as 82-year-old Pak Kian Huat, was charged with the murder of Lim Soi Moy in a district court. District Judge Christopher Goh directed a court order for Pak to be held in remand in police custody at the Central Police Division and revist the crime scene to assist in the murder investigation, and Pak was also scheduled on 9 September 2019 to undergo psychiatric evaluation after the completion of investigations. Pak cannot be offered bail as alleged offenders charged with murder or other capital crimes cannot be granted bail. If found guilty of murder, Pak would be sentenced to death by hanging.

== Background of Lim and Pak ==
Lim Soi Moy, also known as Lim Kim Luan, was born in 1939 in Singapore, while Pak Kian Huat, alias Pek Kiah Huat, was born in 1937 in Singapore, and the both of them first met in the 1950s while they were teenagers; Pak was then a shipyard worker while Lim was a housekeeper. After a decade of knowing each other, Lim and Pak became romantically involved, but Lim's mother did not approve of their relationship, and it was only after Pak and Lim had their first child in 1963, when Lim's mother finally agreed to their relationship. Although the both of them were not officially married, Pak and Lim went on to have a total of four children, two sons and two daughters, one of whom lived abroad in the United States, and by the time Lim and Pak were 79 and 82 respectively, they had adult grandchildren.

According to neighbours and friends, Lim was a hard-working person with a good personality. She once sold noodles at a hawker stall, and once went to a bus interchange in Toa Payoh to sell food to support her family. Since 2013, Lim worked as a kitchen assistant at Safra Toa Payoh McDonald's outlet, and she retired only in 2019, a few months before she was killed. Lim was said to have bore the main responsibility of raising their children by herself, and even sent her children to study overseas. Lim was also said to be active and healthy despite her old age, going to swimming in nearby swimming complexes or near the McDonald's outlet where she used to work. Residents and neighbours also noted that the children were filial and close to their mother, with whom they often went on outings together, but it was observed that Lim and Pak rarely went outdoors together and Lim never made a lot of mentions of her partner, although it was known that Lim and Pak often had conflicts with each other in spite of the depth and length of their relationship. Lim's then colleagues at McDonald's addressed Lim as "Ah Ma" and were very fond of her, and they found her a kind senior who treated the junior workers like her own grandchildren.

During the time they lived together, the relationship between Lim and Pak gradually grew sour as Pak was abusive and bad-tempered towards Lim and their children. Eventually, Lim and her eldest daughter moved out of Pak's flat to live in another place in 1980, through the encouragement of the children. The couple's other daughter and two sons (who were 12, 11 and nine at the time) continued staying with Pak, and after growing up and making their own families, the other three children moved out, leaving Pak to remain alone in his flat at Whampoa. Two decades after they separated, Pak and Lim reconnected in 2004 through their children, and Lim agreed to Pak's request to move in with her, as he did not want to live alone. After moving in to Lim's flat, Pak rented out his Whampoa flat and move in with Lim, paying her S$400 to S$500 a month, and he went on to cohabit with Lim for 15 years before Lim's murder in 2019.

== Pak's account of the murder ==
The following was the official version of the murder of Lim Soi Moy, based on the statements given by Pak and the evidence pieced together by the authorities.

According to Pak, after he first moved into Lim's four-room Toa Payoh flat, he went to sleep into the smallest bedroom of the flat while Lim herself would sleep in a separate bedroom, and the third bedroom, which was dimensionally larger than Pak's bedroom, was often reserved for their children whenever they came to visit and spend the night at their parents' flat. This living arrangement went on for 15 years without any hitches, but on 26 August 2019, Pak hoped to switch to the vacant bedroom meant for their children. He told his younger son that he had the flu and a bad cough, and he felt that the dust in his own small-sized bedroom was worsening the cough and flu, and he complained that Lim did not agree to let him use the bigger-sized vacant room. Through the children's intervention, Pak and Lim agreed that Pak would stay in the vacant room, but he should move back to his original room whenever any of their children stayed with them.

Before 1 September 2019, Pak had to move back to his old bedroom since his elder son would be back to spend the night at the flat. Pak, being aware of this fact, requested to Lim on 31 August 2019 to let him permanently stay inside the vacant room, but Lim did not agree to his request. Pak was therefore angered at this rejection, and his anger lingered on and aggravated throughout the night. According to the statement of facts, at 3:30am on 1 September 2019, Pak went into the kitchen to grab a chopper and entered Lim's bedroom. Lim was awakened from her sleep and she reportedly asked Pak what did he want. Pak said in Hokkien, "li ai wa si, wa buay sai hor li wa", which meant "if you want me to die, then I will not allow you to live either".

Afterwards, Pak brandished the chopper at Lim and hacked her for a total of 54 times until she stopped screaming. After hacking Lim to death, Pak proceeded to wear his socks and shoes after finding the floor slippery with the blood, and he called one of his sons, telling him that he had killed his mother and wanted him to call the police, which the son did. Pak was therefore arrested for murdering 79-year-old Lim Soi Moy, whom he told police had wanted him dead and claimed had fathered the children with other men before the police took him.

== Plea bargain and original trial session ==
Pak Kian Huat, the perpetrator and partner of the victim

Before the trial of Pak Kian Huat for murder was slated to begin, his defence counsel, led by Jonathan Wong, negotiated with the prosecution to reach a plea bargain, and after some discussions from both sides, the prosecution, led by Deputy Public Prosecutor (DPP) Yang Ziliang, agreed to reduce the charge of murder to one of culpable homicide not amounting to murder, which was equivalent to manslaughter in the laws of Singapore, and it was agreed on both sides that Pak would plead guilty. The prosecution was planning to seek 15 to 18 years' jail for Pak while the defence was proposing for a jail term of seven years. The charge of manslaughter under Singapore law would have warranted life imprisonment as the highest penalty if convicted.

On 23 September 2022, a court hearing was convened at the High Court before Justice Aedit Abdullah, and 85-year-old Pak Kian Huat was slated to plead guilty in that hearing itself. However, during the proceedings, Pak repeatedly interrupted the hearing while the whole statement of facts was read out to him through a Mandarin interpreter, and raised a lot of objections towards portions of the statements he made. One of them included the exact number of wounds that Lim sustained from the attack; Pak said that he did not inflict 54 wounds and the judge (who was reportedly bemused) pointed out that it was counted by a medical expert from the Health Sciences Authority found on Lim's body and even asked Pak how did he knew that the number of times he harmed Lim during the attack was not 54. Furthermore, Pak also denied that he told police officers that he was glad to kill his wife, which was clearly recorded in the statement of facts. At another point when Pak interrupted and disputed his statements again, Justice Abdullah had had enough and reprimanded Pak, telling him to behave himself in court properly and stated this was not a coffee shop but a courtroom.

Additionally, Pak opposed to his lawyers' proposal for him to serve seven years in prison, and he stated that he could only accept not more than five years' jail. Pak also stated that he wanted to be given the death penalty if things did not go his way. Justice Abdullah warned him that if Pak continued to dispute the statement of facts, his plea of guilt would not be accepted and hence, he would be claiming trial for the original charge of murder and possibly be hanged for the crime. Pak reportedly said in response, "Fine, death penalty."

Due to this interruption of course proceedings, Pak's plea of guilt did not go through, and Justice Abdullah directed a court order to the prosecution to decide whether they would proceed with putting Pak on trial for the original charge of murder, which would revive the possibility of a death sentence for Pak, or to continue with the reduced charge of manslaughter and hold a Newton hearing to sort out the disputed facts of Pak's police statements. Pak's original defence counsel also applied to discharge themselves from representing him, and their application was approved by the court. Pak later returned to prison where he was remanded since his arrest. Pak's children, who were all present in court, reportedly did not wish to speak to him when the judge inquired them.

== Pak Kian Huat's sentencing ==
On 22 May 2023, eight months after the adjournment of court proceedings, 86-year-old Pak Kian Huat reappeared in court, this time before Justice See Kee Oon, who replaced Aedit Abdullah as the trial judge of the case. At this point, the charge of manslaughter against Pak was still offered in his case. Without any objections to the statement of facts like he previously did, Pak pleaded guilty to the lesser charge and was therefore convicted, and his sentencing trial was carried out on the same date.

The prosecution sought a sentence of 15 to 18 years' imprisonment. Deputy Public Prosecutor (DPP) Dillon Kok argued that Pak's fatal attack on Lim was the "gravest form of domestic violence" and this lethal consequence arose from Lim's kindness towards Pak to allow him cohabit with her to ease his loneliness many years before, and given the cold-blooded and violent nature of the killing and Pak himself persisted in attacking Lim even after she was already down, it showed that Pak had a blatant disregard for human life and cruelly taken undue advantage over his victim. DPP Kok pointed out that despite his advanced age, Pak was able to inflict a huge number of injuries on Lim and cause her death, and the severity of the injuries spoke of the level of force used by Pak during the onslaught, and for this, the prosecution asked that Pak's advanced age should not be taken into account in mitigating the sentence, and a severe punishment was necessitated for the "particularly abhorrent" crime committed in the context of domestic violence, even if it meant that Pak would die in prison in midst of his jail term. Aside from this, per the prosecution's words, the post-killing conduct of Pak, who coldhearted put on his socks and shoes to avoid falling, demonstrated that he was remorseless, unapologetic, selfish and having no ounce of concern for his victim despite their long-term relationship.

On the other hand, leading criminal lawyer Eugene Thuraisingam, who took over Pak's case, urged the court to consider Pak's timely plea of guilt and his remorse, and Pak himself was a first time offender, and he argued that Pak felt rejected and hurt when he was not allowed to use the bigger room, even when he reasoned that the smaller room was worsening his cough. Thuraisingam stated that Pak grew emotional and angry because he did not know how to resolve this issue, and he "acted out of character, with an irrational, disproportionate and misjudged response". In rebuttal, the prosecution described Pak's mitigation plea as a mere opportunity for him to air his grievances against Lim, and he never made any apology to his children, which would have been the bare minimum thing a person with an ounce of genuine regret should do. They also referred to the past instances of abuse Pak had towards Lim, which showed how he tried painting himself as a gentleman who often forgives Lim and it only bear testament to Pak's "chauvinism".

On the same day, Justice See Kee Oon delivered his verdict. In his judgement, Justice See described the chopper attack as a "senseless attack on a defenceless victim" like Lim, which originated from a fairly trivial perceived grievance. Justice See admonished Pak for his utter lack of remorse in view of his ruthlessness during the attack and conduct at the time he was under arrest. He also noted that Pak had inflicted a horrifying number of injuries like 54 on the victim with a chopper, and it demonstrated the ruthless and cold blooded nature of the attack and its intensity, and it only can be inferred that out of the perceived grievances he had towards Lim, Pak had formulated the intention to kill and this intent alone showed just how wicked his character was. Also, Pak's "clear presence of mind" to enter the kitchen and settling on a chopper (after finding the other knives too small) also reinforced the proof of his intent to cause Lim's death.

Aside from this, Justice See made note that at the time of the killing, Pak did not suffer from any mental disorder, and his mental responsibility was not affected at the time of the offence. He also disregarded Pak's advanced age of 86 as a mitigating factor, because of the severity of the offence charged and its heinous nature, which would have warranted the maximum sentence of life imprisonment. Concluding that the killing of Lim Soi Moy was "deliberately and unspeakably vicious and brutal", Justice See found that a harsh sentence was warranted in the need to uphold the principles of deterrence and retribution.

On the balance of probabilities, Justice See felt it was appropriate to sentence 86-year-old Pak Kian Huat to 15 years' imprisonment, and backdate it to the date of Pak's arrest on 1 September 2019. Although caning could also be imposed on top of jail terms for manslaughter, Pak was not caned as he was above 50 years old at the time of sentencing. Since the end of his sentencing, Pak served his 15-year sentence at Changi Prison.

== Death of Pak ==
On 2 December 2025, 88-year-old Pak Kian Huat died of pneumonia while in prison. A coroner's court ruled on 12 May 2026 confirming that Pak died of natural causes and there was no suspected foul play in his case.

== See also ==
- List of major crimes in Singapore
