= List of major crimes in Singapore =

The following is a list of major crimes in Singapore. They are arranged in chronological order.

Major crimes such as murder, homicide, kidnapping, rape and sexual assault, as well as firearms- and explosive-related crimes, are dealt with by the Major Crime Division of the Criminal Investigation Department of the Singapore Police Force. Drug-related crimes such as drug trafficking are handled by the Central Narcotics Bureau. White-collar crimes such as fraud and misappropriation of finances are handled by the Commercial Affairs Department while corruption offences are under the purview of the Corrupt Practices Investigation Bureau. Crimes which are of concern to Singapore's national security are dealt with by the Internal Security Department under the Internal Security Act and other relevant laws.

== Timeline ==
- List of major crimes in Singapore (before 1990)
- List of major crimes in Singapore (1990–1999)
- List of major crimes in Singapore (2000–2009)
- List of major crimes in Singapore (2010–2019)
- List of major crimes in Singapore (2020–present)
