= 2019 in Singapore =

- Decades: 1990s; 2000s; 2010s; 2020s
- See also: Other events of 2019; Timeline of Singaporean history

The following lists events that happened during 2019 in the Republic of Singapore.

== Incumbents ==
- President: Halimah Yacob
- Prime Minister: Lee Hsien Loong

== Events ==
=== January ===
- 1 January
  - The National Environment Agency starts enforcing a smoking ban in Orchard Road. At the same time, the smoking age increases to 19.
  - Jurong Central Plaza is officially opened after the previous Hawker Centre located at the same precinct in Jurong West was on fire in 2016.
- 2 January
  - The registration of e-scooters has started.
  - In response to the new instrument landing system procedures at Seletar Airport, a permanently restricted area in the delegated airspace over Pasir Gudang by Malaysia becomes operational. It would have impacted normal, existing air traffic in the airspace above Johor and Singapore. The restricted airspace and ILS procedures are suspended on 8 January after discussions between the two countries. On 25 January, the suspensions are extended to 31 March.
- 7 January
  - Platinium Dogs Club's owner is arrested by the Agri-Food and Veterinary Authority of Singapore (AVA; now the National Parks Board (NParks) after AVA's dissolution) after a series of alleged animal abuse cases causing one death. The premises were raided by authorities last month.
  - The Thomson–East Coast MRT line will have a station in Founders' Memorial, which will open in 2027.
  - The Ministry of Health announced it will take over ElderShield from Aviva, NTUC Income and Great Eastern Life in 2021.
- 10 January – Go-Jek launched in Singapore.
- 12 January
  - library@harbourfront is officially opened after moving from Bukit Merah. Located in VivoCity, the library places an emphasis on digitalisation.
  - Singapore launched the Year Towards Zero Waste campaign in a bid to raise awareness on waste issues, with a zero-waste masterplan soon.
  - Chen Si Jie wins $193,400 in the long-running MediaCorp Channel 8 game show The Sheng Siong Show, surpassing Low Soh Kim's winnings of $162,550 (previously won on 18 February 2017) as the all-time biggest winner in the show's history.
- 13 January – The Ten Mile Junction LRT station on the Bukit Panjang LRT line becomes the first operational train station in Singapore to permanently close.
- 14 January
  - CapitaLand will acquire Ascendas-Singbridge in an S$11b deal, creating Asia's largest real estate company. The acquisition, subsequently approved on 12 April by 90% of shareholders is completed on 30 June and unified the next day.
  - The Payment Services Act is passed to streamline payment laws and puts a cap on money in e-wallets.
  - During the O Level results, the Singapore Examinations and Assessment Board reveals that 32 Additional Mathematics Paper 2 exam scripts which belonged to students from two secondary schools went missing in the United Kingdom while being transported for marking. That happened after the bag containing the scripts was mistakenly taken by a passenger. On-screen marking of scripts may be used more often after this incident.
- 15 January
  - SingHealth cyberattack: The Personal Data Protection Commission (PDPC) fines IHiS S$750,000 and SingHealth S$250,000 for not doing enough to safeguard personal data under the Personal Data Protection Act, the largest imposed on data breaches. Separately, more measures are announced to strengthen the cybersecurity of healthcare, including separating the Ministry of Health's chief information security officer (MOH CISO) and IHiS cybersecurity director into two separate posts, better defences, piloting a "Virtual Browser" and continuation of Internet Surfing Separation. Contributions to the National Electronic Health Record will be deferred.
  - Changes to the Misuse of Drugs Act are passed to emphasise rehabilitation and protect children from drugs.
- 18 January
  - Food products with alcohol, including alcoholic ice cream, can be sold after 10:30 pm following an exemption under the Liquor Control (Supply and Consumption) Act. This comes after FairPrice restricted the sale of such ice cream to comply with the Act, prompting a review that was announced on 25 October 2018.
  - Surbana Jurong starts building its new global headquarters in the future Jurong Innovation District, located close to Nanyang Technological University. When completed in 2021, the headquarters will research on urban solutions.
  - MINDEF announced that the F-35 Joint Strike Fighter is identified as the most suitable replacement for the F-16s, which face obsolescence beyond 2030. A small number of F-35s will be purchased for evaluation before full-scale deployment.
- 19 January – The Decathlon Singapore Lab store at Stadium Drive in Kallang located near Singapore Sports Hub is officially opened, and operated by both Decathlon and Sports Singapore.
- 21 January – The Singapore Philatelic Museum and Peranakan Museum will undergo enhancement works.
- 23 January – Former Mediacorp actor and national serviceman Aloysius Pang dies due to injuries sustained when the barrel of a self-propelled Howitzer was lowered while he was repairing it with two other SAF personnel during Exercise Thunder Warrior in Waiouru Military Camp, New Zealand. It was the fourth fatality related to military training in less than two years.
- 25 January
  - The first phase of the Cross Island MRT line is unveiled with 12 stations. To be completed by 2029, the 29 km (18 miles) line spans from Changi to Bishan, passing through Loyang, Pasir Ris, Defu, Hougang and Ang Mo Kio.
  - Design Orchard opens to the public with 61 local brands.
- 26 January
  - A brief power outage affects Bishan, Ang Mo Kio, Toa Payoh and Thomson. The outage is traced to a fire in the Bright Hill substation.
  - Wisma Geylang Serai opens in Geylang.
- 28 January
  - The Singapore Bicentennial celebrations are launched to commemorate the founding of modern Singapore by Stamford Raffles 200 years ago.
  - Ministry of Health reveals that personal data of about 14,200 people with HIV have been illegally disclosed.
- 30 January
  - Plans are unveiled to revamp Orchard Road.
  - Grab announced its new headquarters in one-north, to be ready by 2020. Construction began on 29 March with a new function to plan journeys and pay for public transportation fares to be launched soon.

=== February ===
- 1 February
  - New speed limits for personal mobility devices (PMDs) take effect, among other changes.
  - Mediacorp becomes YouTube's strategic content partner. As part of the partnership, Channel NewsAsia is now live on YouTube 24/7.
  - Pedra Branca is now included in East Coast GRC.
- 7 February – After several service lapses, SingPost is fined $100,000 for failing local delivery standards in 2017.
- 9 February – The Polaris vessel collided with the Pireas tanker in Singapore territorial waters off Tuas.
- 10 February – A police officer, SSGT Salinah Mohamed was knocked down by a car while crossing the junction of Maxwell Road and Shenton Way. She succumbed to her injuries in hospital four days later.
- 14 February
  - Mediacorp's Internet Television website Toggle collaborates with HBO GO.
  - A power outage strikes central Singapore caused by a fire resulting from an equipment failure that led to an electric flashover at a substation at Carlton Hotel.
  - The Land Transport Authority (LTA) suspends ofo's licence after failing to comply with new rules. ofo is required to remove all bicycles by 13 March.
- 15 February
  - Digital Defence is unveiled as the sixth pillar of Total Defence.
  - A-Level graduates will now be allowed to seek exemption from some modules and start polytechnic earlier, saving six months.
- 16 February – Ministry of Health reveals errors in subsidies given to 7,700 Community Health Assist Scheme (CHAS) patients in 2018, caused by issues in the computer systems administered by NCS Pte Ltd.
- 17 February – Oasis Terraces is officially opened in Punggol as HDB's first new-generation neighbourhood centre after having its soft openings on 15 June 2018. Five more such centres are in the pipeline with existing centres to be upgraded.
- 18 February
  - The Merdeka Generation Package is unveiled to support Singaporeans who contributed during the Merdeka era.
  - The first Type 218SG submarine, Invincible is launched in Germany, equipped with new technologies and better able to handle Singapore waters. The diesel-electric submarine is the first new submarine to be acquired by Singapore and will only be delivered in 2021. The names of three other submarines are revealed too, with delivery by 2024.
- 22 February – Razer Inc. starts construction on its new one-north headquarters with plans for more staff in future. A new digital real estate start-up called Echo Base is launched too, with its first smart city project in the region to be developed soon.
- 24 February - Buangkok Square shopping mall in Buangkok, Singapore is officially opened.

=== March ===
- 1 March
  - Singapore will initially purchase four F-35 jets to replace the aging F-16s by the 2030s, with an option for eight more planes should Singapore proceed. Plans are outlined for a future SAF, including multi-role combat vessels with drones, a next-generation Armoured Fighting Vehicle, upgraded Leopard tanks, an expanded network of optical sensors and coastal radars, and unmanned surface vessels from 2020. There will be new training facilities at the expanded Queensland training area, and a new Cyber NSF scheme. The Defence Cyber Security Centre has been set up since 2018, and Defence Cyber Incident Response Teams will be created to respond to cyber incidents.
  - An NS Hub will be built near MINDEF's headquarters by 2023, consolidating all NS-related services like medical checks, an army mart and IPPT tests in it as opposed to being scattered currently across Singapore. However, the current Fitness Conditioning Centres will remain open even with the new Hub. The Hub will be high-tech too.
- 4 March
  - A new Agri-Food Innovation Park will be built in Sungei Kadut by 2021.
  - Singapore will roll out 5G networks by 2020.
- 5 March
  - Nanyang Technological University and Volvo launch the world's first full-sized driverless electric bus for trial.
  - The Ministry of Education announced that streaming will be replaced by Subject-Based Banding where 3 bands (G1, G2 and G3) will replace Normal (Tech), Normal (Academic) and Express respectively. At Sec 4, there will be a common exam starting from 2027 with students graduating with a common certificate, replacing the O Levels and N Levels. These changes will take effect in 2024. Also in are rebuilding and upgrading works for 4 junior colleges and the formation of Uplift Office to help disadvantaged students in Singapore.
  - The Ministry of Social and Family Development will launch Community Link to help those living in rental flats, as well as a pilot Localised Community Network.
- 6 March
  - The Ministry of Health (MOH) announced a free opt-in HPV vaccine programme for Secondary 1 girls to prevent cervical cancer. More accurate cervical cancer tests and non-fasting health screenings are on the cards too. In addition, two polyclinics in Serangoon and Tengah will be built by 2025, and a new green CHAS card will be launched from November 2019 for those with chronic health conditions. Existing CHAS cards will also have more benefits too. A proposed ban on trans fat is announced too.
  - The former Bukit Timah Fire Station will be turned into a visitors centre and recreation node for people traveling along the Rail Corridor and link nature areas. More of such nodes will be developed progressively.
- 7 March
  - The Infocomm Media Development Authority cancels black metal band Watain's concert in Singapore at the last minute after the Ministry of Home Affairs cited "security concerns". A petition calling for Watain and Soilwork to be banned from performing in Singapore begun the previous day gathering more than 16,000 signatures.
  - Hume MRT station will be built by 2025 following plans for the refurbished Bukit Timah Fire Station and a future NS Hub. At the same time, there are no plans to extend the MRT to Tuas South and Jurong Island for now.
  - Several new initiatives for Housing and Development Board (HDB) buyers are announced, including shorter balloting time of 3 weeks, putting up Build-to-order (BTO) flats six months in advance, assisted living facilities, revision to schemes, improvements to rental flats, allowing divorcees to apply for flats aftering obtaining an Interim Judgement and settling ancillary matters on matrimonial property among others.
- 12 March
  - Civil Aviation Authority of Singapore temporarily suspends operation of all variants of Boeing 737 MAX aeroplanes into and out of Singapore's airspace after the Lion Air Flight 610 and Ethiopian Airlines Flight 302 crashes, occurring within five months of each other.
  - Mobike becomes the fourth major bicycle-sharing operator to withdraw its operation from Singapore.
- 14 March – Singapore and Malaysia reach an agreement on the maritime issue that suspended previously imposed port limits.
- 15 March
  - Health Sciences Authority reveals that data relating to 800,000 patients' blood donations were leaked in a vulnerability leading to unauthorized access.
  - Local online grocer RedMart is now part of Lazada's website as part of its future expansion.
- 22 March – In midst of the international pleas for clemency to the Singapore government, Malaysian Micheal Anak Garing was executed by hanging in Changi Prison for murdering a construction worker in Kallang, Singapore.
- 22 – 30 March – PCF Sparkletots pre-schools report that 251 children from 13 centres fell victim to food poisoning and diarrhoea caused by food served by Kate's Catering. The provider's licenses are suspended with investigations conducted. This is the second mass food poisoning case in five months.
- 23 March – The Sengkang General Hospital and Sengkang Community Hospital are officially opened.
- 25 March – Singtel launches Gomo, a new mobile plan targeting millennials.
- 27 March – Urban Redevelopment Authority unveils the latest masterplan. Among them include the first-ever underground maps in Jurong Innovation District, Marina Bay and Punggol Digital District, as well as the CBD Incentive Scheme and Strategic Development Incentive to encourage mixed-use developments in the CBD, which is currently dominated by offices. A new 50 km Greater Rustic Coast is also planned along the northern coast, as well as a 24 km Rail Corridor by 2021 and an additional 1,000 ha of green spaces. There will be new homes planned in the CBD, Bayshore, Farrer Park and Dakota, with Farrer Park's sporting history to be conserved.
- 28 March
  - Singapore submits its hawker culture nomination to UNESCO, first announced during the National Day Rally last year.
  - Three brands of losartan (a high blood pressure drug) are recalled due to unacceptable amounts of cancer-causing nitrosamine impurities, affecting 137,000 patients. This comes after several countries started recalling such products.
- 29 March
  - Channel NewsAsia rebrands as CNA and announced it will launch a new radio station and citizen journalism website at a later date.
  - Siloso Green will open by end-2019, taking over the space held by Underwater World before its closure in 2016.
  - SingPost is fined a record $300,000 for failing to meet service standards in 2018, the second such fine imposed.
- 30 March – The Coast-To-Coast Trail spanning 36 km from Coney Island in Punggol to the Jurong Lake Gardens in Jurong is launched. A park connector in Seletar is opened and future park connectors are unveiled.

=== April ===
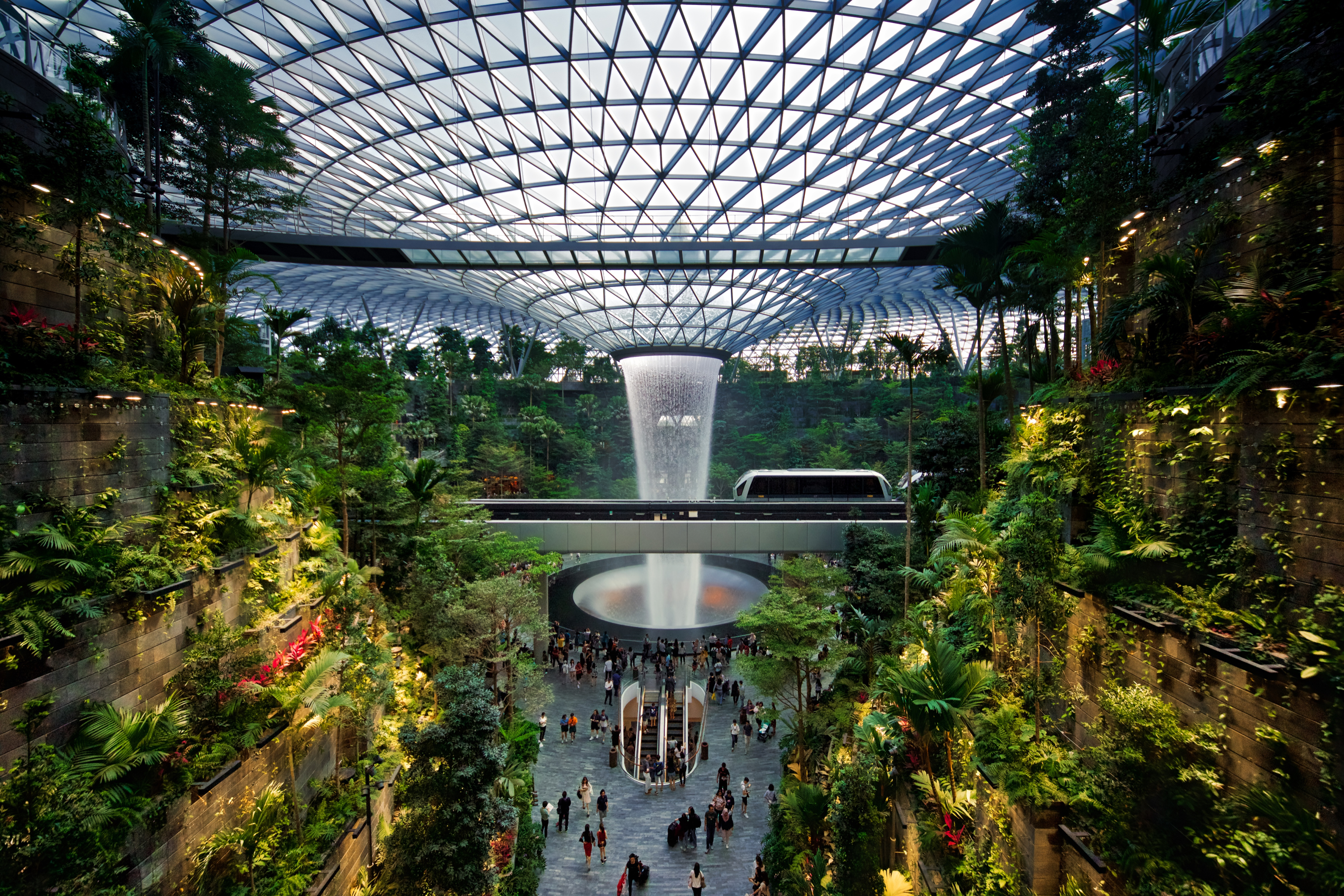
Jewel Changi Airport

- 1 April
  - The Singapore Food Agency is formed after the dissolution of Agri-Food and Veterinary Authority of Singapore, handling food safety and food security matters. Animal and veterinary services are transferred to National Parks Board (NParks) under the Animal and Veterinary Service.
  - DesignSingapore is transferred to the Economic Development Board from the Ministry of Communications and Information to help local companies expand beyond Singapore.
  - The Protection from Online Falsehoods and Manipulation Bill is introduced in Parliament to tackle the spread of fake news. After concerns are raised about the Bill's scope, the ministers assured the bill will not affect free speech. The Bill is passed with a vote of 72-9 on 8 May after a two-day debate. It imposes a fine or jail term for rule violations. The law takes effect on 2 October.
  - The first tranche of Misuse of Drugs Act amendments take effect on modes of drug tests (saliva, urine and hair tests), minimum one year jail and changes to Long Term imprisonment regimes, among others.
- 3 April
  - The Ministry of Trade and Industry unveils an expansion plan costing S$9 billion for Marina Bay Sands and Resorts World Sentosa, along with plans to increase hotel capacity, new entertainment venues and higher casino levies and taxes. The higher levies of S$150 daily and S$3,000 annually take effect the following day.
  - Bike-sharing operators Anywheel and Moov Technology are granted licences for bike-sharing, while Ywise Circle failed to obtain one.
- 4 April – SimplyGo is launched to allow commuters to pay for transportation with cards, initially opened to MasterCard users.
- 6 April – Singapore and Malaysia reach an agreement on the aviation issue, including the suspension of the instrument landing system (ILS) at Seletar Airport allowing Firefly to resume flights to Singapore, and suspending the proposed restricted area in Pasir Gudang. The agreement results in the resumption of flights from 21 April.
- 7 April – The National Archives of Singapore building reopens.
- 8 April – Singapore and Malaysia suspend the port limits claims, reverting to pre-October 2018 boundaries. A group will be formed to delineate the boundary while the nations work on a GPS-based instrument system for Seletar Airport and worked on a six-month suspension of the Johor Bahru–Singapore Rapid Transit System, which is eventually agreed.
- 10 April – Cinema ticket presales open for the blockbuster film Avengers: Endgame, which is first screened in cinemas on 24 April and later sets a record for its biggest box-office in Singapore; high demand for online presales causes the servers of cinema websites to become either slow or unresponsive.
- 12 April – YotelAir Singapore Changi Airport opens at Jewel Changi Airport.
- 14 April – Restaurant chain Kenny Rogers Roasters closes its last outlet at Great World City. It made a return at JEM in October.
- 15 April – Singapore Airlines and Garuda Indonesia expand a code-sharing agreement to include Singapore-Jakarta flights.
- 16 April – A new tourism development will be built in Jurong Lake District by 2026. Mandai will be revamped and Sentosa will award grants for operators through an enterprise scheme. There will be two new attractions, being the Time Capsule at Singapore Flyer and a NERF attraction at Marina Square.
- 17 April – Jewel Changi Airport opens after a week-long preview. Among the new shops are Shake Shack, A&W (which returned after closing in 2003), a Pokémon Center, among other new stores.
- 19 April – A victim, Monica Baey reveals that a voyeur at National University of Singapore (NUS) was let off lightly after perpetrating sexual harassment, sparking a controversy. NUS convenes a review committee, and two petitions demanding stiffer penalties are launched while Education Minister Ong Ye Kung called the sentences "manifestly inadequate" and seeks a review; all universities have since been told to do so. Bathroom security is subsequently tightened with covered entrances and more security guards in place. On 10 June, the committee released recommendations for tougher penalties, which NUS accepted. On 29 August, NUS sets up a Victim Care Unit for victims who have encountered some form of sexual misconduct.
- 21 April – Two police reports (but did not come to light until 24 April) relating to voyeurism in university bathrooms are lodged in Nanyang Technological University (NTU).
- 22 April – Guocoland unveils Guoco Midtown, a mixed-use development in the Ophir-Rochor area with an office block, a residential block and public spaces. The development will be completed by 2022.
- 23 April – Tuas Port is 75% finished and the last caisson is installed, putting the port on-target for its intended opening date of 2021.
- 27 April – The first phase of the enhanced Jurong Lake Gardens is launched with new facilities, making it the first national garden in the heartlands and third in Singapore. Works for the second phase will commence soon with completion by 2021. Also, Sports Singapore's new ActiveSG Park with an indoor gym and swimming pool are officially opened in Jurong Lake Gardens in Jurong West, Singapore.
- 30 April – A new integrated health hub in Jurong comprising a bigger polyclinic and a nursing home will be ready by 2025.

=== May ===
- 1 May – Minister for Finance Heng Swee Keat succeeds both Teo Chee Hean and Tharman Shanmugaratnam as the Deputy Prime Minister of Singapore, with both of them becoming Senior Ministers in a reshuffle.
- 3 May – Graduates from local schools will receive digital certificates through OpenCerts, a blockchain platform, from this year.
- 4 May – The Health Promotion Board suspends redemption for more than 62,000 Healthy 365 users after abnormalities were found.
- 5 May – The Housing and Development Board unveils plans for a new park in Bidadari by 2022.
- 6 May
  - It is concluded that the death of Aloysius Pang occurred due to lapses by all three in charge. In response to this, safety refreshers will be carried out.
  - Amendments to the Penal Code are passed to protect vulnerable groups and minors, increase protection for sex crime victims with new offences to tackle trends, abolish marital immunity for rape cases, decriminalise suicide, among other changes.
- 9 May
  - The Ministry of Health announced the first imported case of monkeypox, which was contracted by a Nigerian who came to Singapore. The patient made a full recovery on 24 May and left Singapore thereafter.
  - The Ng Teng Fong Centre for Healthcare Innovation is officially opened to prototype new ideas for Singapore's healthcare sector.
  - Rules on CPF use and HDB loans will now focus on whether the HDB can last the owner for life, unlike on the HDB's remaining lease previously. They include allowing CPF use for ageing flats if it lasts the youngest buyer until 95, and a maximum HDB loan of 90 percent property price or valuation. The rules take effect the following day.
- 12 May – A flyover opens between one-north and the Ayer Rajah Expressway.
- 14 May – CapitaLand unveils the design of One Pearl Bank. Redeveloped from Pearl Bank Apartments, the 178m condominium will be completed by 2023, making it the tallest condominium in Outram.
- 16 May – The Singapore Red Cross announced that their website was hacked, causing a data leak affecting more than 4,200 people.
- 18 May
  - StarHub launched Giga, a mobile plan targeting millennials.
  - The Public Utilities Board takes over the Tuaspring plant from Hyflux after the latter faced heavy debts.
- 21 May – Singapore and Malaysia have agreed to suspend the Johor Bahru–Singapore Rapid Transit System for 6 months until 30 September. On 28 September, Malaysia extended the suspension to 31 October, which is confirmed by the Ministry of Transport two days later. In addition, no costs will be borne for extending the suspension.
- 23 May - My First Skool has welcomed its biggest kindergarten campus at Punggol Drive.
- 24 May – Science Centre Singapore announced that the Lakeside location will be ready by 2025.
- 25 May – The Land Transport Authority announced several MRT extensions as part of the Land Transport Master Plan 2040. Among them are the new Brickland and Sungei Kadut stations along the North–South MRT line and Downtown MRT line extension to Sungei Kadut station by the mid-2030s, an extension of the Thomson–East Coast MRT line to Changi Airport Terminal 5 by 2040 resulting in conversion of the Changi Airport section of the East–West MRT line to the Thomson–East Coast MRT line, and a possible new MRT line from Woodlands to the Greater Southern Waterfront. Enhancements to bus services, cycling routes, linkways and help for vulnerable groups are also announced too.
- 28 May – The Ministry of Education announced the expansion of language and literature programmes to more schools soon. At the same time, several schools are abolishing mid-year exams by 2020 as opposed to a 2021 deadline announced last year.
- 30 May – Mediacorp's Internet Television website Toggle collaborates with tvN Movies.

=== June ===
- 1 June – 31 December – The showcase, From Singapore to Singaporean: The Bicentennial Experience, is held at Fort Canning Park. Supposed to end on 15 September, the exhibition is extended from 1 October to 31 December, allowing more people to view the exhibition.
- 1 June – Singapore Civil Defence Force fire engines, red rhinos and fire-medical vehicles can now run red lights and make unauthorised U-turns during emergencies.
- 3 June – Radio station 938Now is rebranded as CNA938.
- 5 June – President Halimah Yacob launches a commemorative $20 note to mark Singapore's 200th year.
- 6 June
  - Visa users can now use SimplyGo.
  - The Ministry of Health announced a ban on partially hydrogenated oils (PHOs) from June 2021, which aims to encourage healthy choices. In addition, 6 companies pledged to go PHO-free by June 2020.
- 8 June – The National Environment Agency launches a nationwide campaign called "Say YES to Waste Less" with 59 partners, covering more than 1,600 premises reaching millions of consumers. It aims to reduce the use of disposables and encourage reusables.
- 10 June – The Canopy Park and Changi Experience Studio opens at Jewel Changi Airport.
- 11 June – The Singapore Armed Forces unveils the Hunter, a fully digital Armoured Fighting Vehicle (AFV) which is also air-conditioned.
- 15 June – Deputy Prime Minister Heng Swee Keat launches the Singapore Together movement where the Government will work with citizens on ideas to improve policies for the environment, housing, youth and social mobility.
- 18 June – Construction starts on The Esplanade's new 550-seat theatre, known as the Singtel Waterfront Theatre. The theatre will be completed by the second half of 2021.
- 19 June – Unauthorised drones are spotted around the vicinity of Changi Airport, causing 37 flights to be delayed and a runway to be shut intermittently.
- 21 June
  - A power outage hits Yishun, caused by cable damage during works carried out by a contractor.
  - A massive fire broke out at a liquefied petroleum gas (LPG) facility in Jalan Buroh, killing one man and injuring two others.
- 23 June – Coffeehouse Dôme closes its last outlet at Parkway Parade.
- 24 June
  - Another drone incident takes place around the vicinity of Changi Airport, made worse by bad weather, causing 18 flights to be delayed, another 7 diverted.
  - StarHub extends cable services until 30 September instead of 30 June in view of high fibre sign-ups, giving consumers until 31 August to do so. The migration is completed on 30 September.
- 26 June – A new Digital Industry Singapore office is launched to encourage companies to digitalise.
- 27 June
  - A fifth MVNO, Grid Mobile starts operations.
  - Singapore Airlines and Malaysia Airlines sign an agreement to expand code-sharing, with other services to be included soon.
- 28 June
  - Funan reopens to the public after reconstruction works are completed. The new Funan will be based on online-and-offline shopping with an emphasis on technology, as well as a new theatre by W!LD RICE.
  - The Monetary Authority of Singapore announced that five digital banks will be allowed to set up operations here.
- 30 June – The first phase of SAFTI City, a future urban training ground, starts construction, opening in phases from 2023. In addition, a new counter-terror centre will open by end-2019.

=== July ===
- 1 July
  - Only e-scooters that are compliant with Land Transport Authority’s device criteria (including UL-2272 certification) can be used. 85,000 e-scooters have since been registered.
  - The Ministry of Health announced new laws that will take effect from 1 July 2020, collectively known as the SP measures to protect the public from tobacco use. They include the mandatory use of standardised packaging and no logos, among others.
  - A sixth MVNO, redONE starts operations.
  - Shaw Theatres closes its Choa Chu Kang branch for major renovations.
- 3 July – CapitaLand announced that Ascott and Ascendas' hospitality REITs will be merged to form Asia's largest hospitality trust with S$7.6b in assets combined, coming after the recent acquisition of Ascendas-Singbridge.
- 4 July – Phase 2 of the future Tuas Terminal starts construction, with the first caisson launched. At the same time, the Maritime and Port Authority of Singapore will replace the current patrol vessels with seven patrol craft over the next three years, as well as two patrol launches. The first phase of digital Maritime Single Window will be launched by end 2019 to ease port clearance procedure.
- 5 July – The National University Centre for Oral Health, Singapore officially opens.
- 7 July – Plans for a mixed-use development in Buangkok are unveiled. To be developed by CapitaLand and City Developments Limited, the development will house a mall containing a hawker centre and childcare centre, community club and condominiums, which will be completed by 2022.
- 8 July
  - After recent drone intrusions around Changi Airport, drone registration will be compulsory from around end-2019, with stiffer penalties planned.
  - Changes to the Road Traffic Act are passed to introduce stiffer penalties for irresponsible drivers, mandate drivers to stop in accidents with animals, among other changes. In addition, physical driving licences will stop being issued as part of digitalisation. The amendments have come into force on 1 November.
- 10 July – Coding will be made compulsory for upper primary students from 2020.
- 13 July – Apple opens its second Singapore store at Jewel Changi Airport. It is also the first Apple store to open in an airport complex.
- 25 July – From 2020, Primary 5 students will be graded with Achievement Levels (ALs) in preparation for new Primary School Leaving Examination (PSLE) grades taking effect in 2021. The grades will be replaced with ALs 1 to 8, with those in Foundation getting ALs A to C (equal to Standard ALs 6 to 8). Students must get a score of 8, or a score of 9 to 14 and AL1/AL2 in Mother Tongue or Distinction/Merit in Higher Mother Tongue to take Higher Mother Tongue at Secondary level. In addition, cut-off points for secondary school based on ALs will be released by mid-2021.
- 26 July – To mark National Day, Huawei launched a 3-day promotion of a S$54 smartphone (limited quantity) for the elderly, causing many to queue. The phone was sold within hours, causing angry crowds. Huawei subsequently issued an apology for that.
- 27 July – The Singapore Army launches the new Wheeled Recovery Vehicle. It can support up to 35 tonnes of recovery capacity compared to the MB 2636A Recovery Truck at 26 tonnes (unable to support vehicles like the Terrex ICV). The Vehicle has a rotator crane allowing the crew to recover from different angles or positions and a dual-action feature allowing it to lift and winch at the same time. The Vehicle is equipped with safety features like an armoured cabin, a Multi-Functional Controller, among others.
- 31 July – OCBC Bank launches cash withdrawal services via QR codes for increased security, making OCBC the first bank in Singapore to offer it.

=== August ===
- 1 August – The second tranche of Misuse of Drugs Act amendments take effect for provisions that protect children and support drug abusers more, among others.
- 2 August – A new Customs, Immigration and Quarantine (CIQ) facility is officially opened at One°15. The only marina to be designated an immigration facility, it streamlines immigration procedures as compared to stopping at Sisters' Islands previously.
- 3 August
  - The National Heritage Board will gazette the Padang and the Singapore River Bridges (Cavenagh Bridge, Anderson Bridge and Elgin Bridge) as National Monuments soon as announced by Deputy Prime Minister Heng Swee Keat.
  - Progress Singapore Party is officially launched.
- 5 August – After several fires involving personal mobility devices (PMDs), including a fatality in Bukit Batok, several new rules on PMDs are announced after a review. All PMDs must be UL2272 certified by 1 July 2020 instead of 1 January 2021 previously, as well as mandatory inspection of all e-scooters from 1 April 2020. More officers will be deployed for enforcement. An initiative to safely dispose non-UL2272 PMDs will be announced soon. In addition, all 15 PAP Town Councils will ban PMDs from void decks and common areas for public safety, with a three-month trial for pedestrian-only zones where PMDs have to be dismounted and pushed. A trial for school zone markings on footpaths has started and will expand to other schools by next month. A fund will be set up to tackle PMD accident-prone hotspots. There will be 750 km of cycling paths by 2025, and triple the current cycling network by 2030.
- 6 August
  - The largest NTUC FairPrice store opens in VivoCity.
  - The Kallang Alive project is announced as part of 15 recommendations to the Vision 2030 review, spanning eight focus areas. The development includes the first velodrome here, a football hub, tennis centre, speed climbing wall, and redevelopment of the Kallang Theatre and other surrounding areas. Children will also get more opportunities to participate in non-CCA sports under the Children and Youth Sport framework.
- 7 August
  - 46 countries sign the Singapore Convention on Mediation (also known as the UN Convention on International Settlement Agreements Resulting from Mediation), the first UN treaty named after Singapore.
  - The Singapore Symphony Orchestra, conducted by Joshua Tan, makes a re-recording of the national anthem, Majulah Singapura at the Esplanade Concert Hall.
- 8 August – Maxwell Chambers Suites opens to keep up with demand for dispute resolution.
- 9 August – A 4K television trial starts with the broadcast of National Day Parade in 4K.
- 12 August – The National Parks Board (NParks) announced a full ban on domestic ivory trade from 1 September 2021 to stamp out illegal trade in endangered species as international ivory trade had been banned under CITES since 1990. Exemptions will apply for educational and religious purposes, as well as musical instruments and personal effects containing ivory.
- 18 August
  - The Islamic Religious Council of Singapore (MUIS) will introduce a new postgraduate course to nurture a cohesive society. At the same time, the Ministry of Education will soon introduce more pathways to help ITE students upgrade their skills.
  - Several changes are announced for education. Among them are raising preschool subsidies' income ceiling from $7,500 to $12,000 with the Government providing the most preschool places, expansion of KidStart, lower fees of $7,500 for Singapore University of Social Sciences and Singapore Institute of Technology students, enhanced bursaries covering up to 75% and 95% of university and polytechnic fees respectively (previously 50% and 85%); applicable for students at ITE, NAFA and LASALLE, and enhanced bursaries for medical courses in universities; with lower-income students paying at most $5000.
  - The retirement and re-employment ages will increase to 65 and 70 respectively by 2030. The first increase of 63 and 68 years will take place in 2022 with the public service raising them in 2021. CPF contribution rates for workers aged 55 to 70 will be raised over 10 years with the first increase in 2021. Eventually, the rates will taper off when workers turn 60 and level off at 70.
  - A three-pronged strategy to deal with climate change was announced. Several ideas are announced to tackle climate change, including empoldering the East Coast and reclaiming several offshore islands, and a planned second pump opposite Marina Barrage, which could cost S$100 billion stretching 50 to 100 years. In addition, new developments will have to be built at least 4m above mean sea level.
  - New plans for the Greater Southern Waterfront are announced. The Keppel Club will be redeveloped to have 9,000 homes comprising HDB and private homes. More office spaces shall be built, as well as new attractions like the redevelopment of Pasir Panjang power plant, a "Downtown South" by NTUC on Pulau Brani, revitalisation of Sentosa's beaches, nature and heritage areas, and finally linking the GSW to other green areas.
  - Killing of Nasiari Sunee – a racially motivated and Islamophobic attack enacted by Australian Andrew Gosling.
- 19 August – Royal Dutch Shell launches electric vehicle chargers at petrol stations in Singapore, the first in Southeast Asia. By October, 10 petrol stations will offer this service.
- 27 August – After 38 years, DFS Group announced it will close its liquor and tobacco stores in Changi Airport by June 2020 due to a challenging environment. Lotte Duty Free will take over DFS' shops from 9 June 2020, being awarded the tender on 24 October.
- 27 August – The Land Transport Authority (LTA) awards several non-fare businesses along the Thomson–East Coast MRT line, with Asiaray Connect awarded an advertising contract and a consortium comprising SMRT Experience, JR Business Development SEA and Alphaplus Investments appointed to run retail space, the first time non-fare businesses are outsourced.
- 30 August
  - Paya Lebar Quarter opens in Paya Lebar.
  - The first Zero Waste Masterplan is launched to reduce waste disposed into Semakau landfill by 30 per cent in 2030, with new laws, more recycling facilities and e-waste recycling facilities in the pipeline, and new recycling labels launched for proper recycling habits.

=== September ===
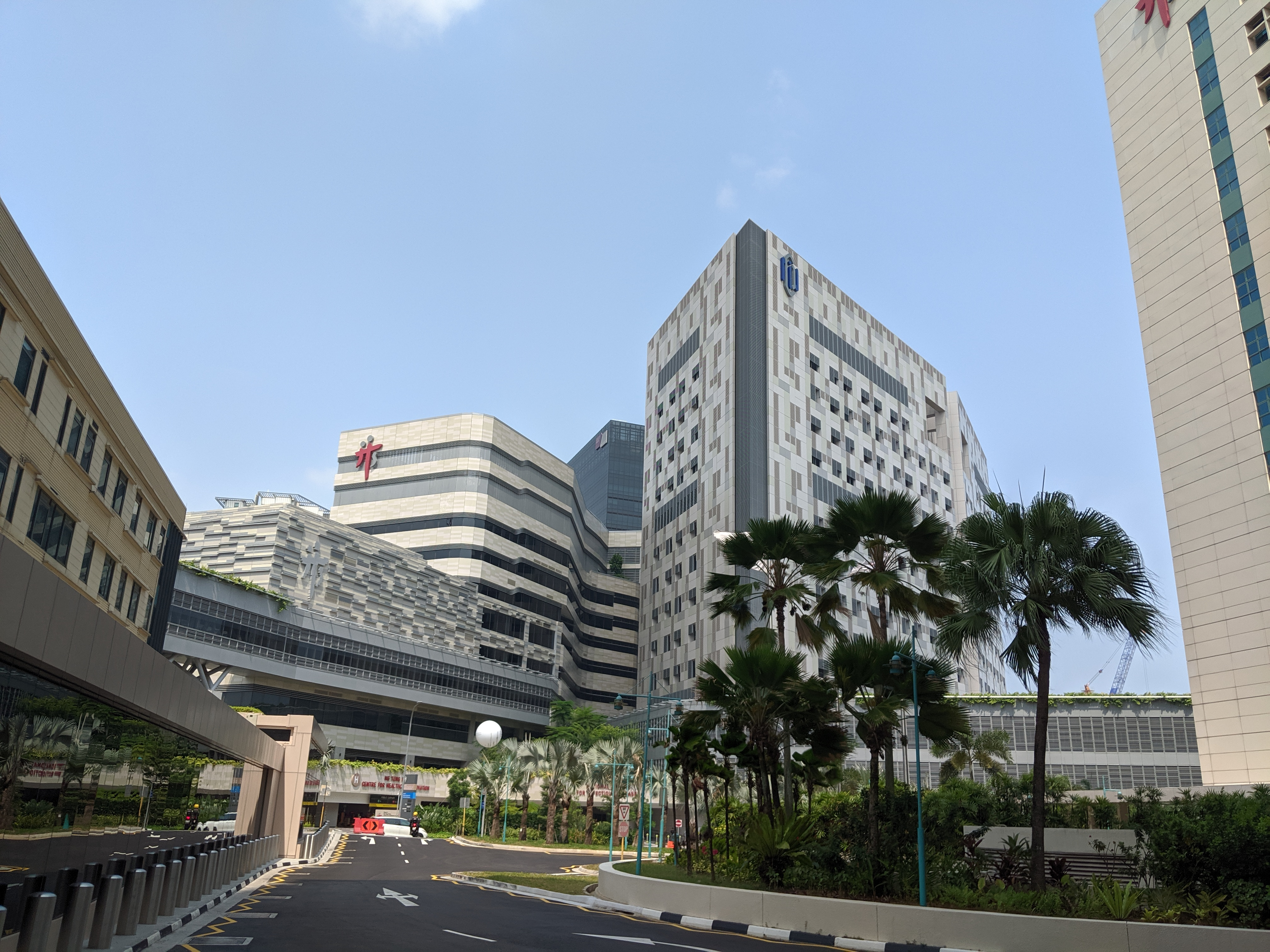
National Centre for Infectious Diseases and Centre of Healthcare Innovation

- 1 September
  - The collection of NRIC numbers is now made illegal.
  - A ban on PMDs along void decks, common areas takes effect in PAP Town Councils.
  - MPH Bookstores closes its last outlet at Parkway Parade, following the closure of its other bookstore in Raffles City on 28 July. It made a return in November at SingPost Centre.
- 2 September – BreadTalk announced that it will acquire Food Junction from Auric Pacific for S$80 million, which started on 30 August. On 15 October, the Competition and Consumer Commission of Singapore allows the acquisition, making BreadTalk the third largest food operator in Singapore after NTUC Enterprise (which acquired Kopitiam in 2018) and Koufu.
- 3 September – Shopee opens its new six-storey headquarters at Singapore Science Park, six times larger than its previous headquarters at Ascent Building. This strengthens its push into the digital economy.
- 4 September – An Electoral Boundaries Review Committee (EBRC) is announced for the next general election, being formed on 1 August.
- 6 September – W!LD RICE's new theatre opens in Funan.
- 7 September – The National Centre for Infectious Diseases is officially opened, replacing Communicable Diseases Centre. The building has a location tracking system to pinpoint interactions between people during outbreaks and houses Singapore's first high-level isolation unit.
- 8 September – Yishun Integrated Transport Hub opens.
- 9 September – The National Day Parade will be held at The Float @ Marina Bay in 2020 and 2021 before the venue is torn for the upcoming NS Square in 2023, with completion by 2026.
- Mid-September – 2019 Southeast Asian haze: Singapore is shrouded in haze, the worst since the 2015 and 2016 haze crises.
  - 14 September – At 4pm, the 24-hour Pollutant Standards Index (PSI) enters the "unhealthy" range of above 100 for the first time since 2016, starting from 103 in western Singapore. The PSI steadily climbs up from there.
  - 15 September – At 1am, all parts of Singapore registered "unhealthy" PSI readings, peaking at 124 from 5am to 8am in western Singapore. Despite this, the air quality improves over the next two days, resulting in the PSI dropping to "moderate" levels.
  - 18 September – The haze returns to Singapore, resulting in the PSI increasing to "unhealthy" levels seen last weekend.
  - 19 September – At 4am in southern Singapore, the PSI peaks at 154. From there, the haze situation improves with all parts of Singapore registering "moderate" PSI levels by 9pm.
  - 21 September – The haze returns with the PSI hitting unhealthy levels.
  - 22 September – The PSI stays at unhealthy levels for almost the entire day.
  - 23 September – Rain comes, bringing relief from the haze, with more rain the next few days.
- 20 September – Sentosa Development Corporation launches the Sentosa-Brani Master Plan to transform Sentosa and Pulau Brani, spanning the next two to three decades. Both islands will be divided into five zones, namely Vibrant Cluster, Island Heart, Waterfront, Ridgeline and Beachfront. Transportation will be enhanced, with a future "Downtown South" resort on Pulau Brani once the port moves out in 2027. As a result, the Sentosa Merlion will make way for Sentosa Sensoryscape, a S$90 million themed linkway linking Resorts World Sentosa and the beaches, which will finish by 2022.
- 21 September – The first Singapore Climate Rally is held in Hong Lim Park as part of climate strikes around the world, attracting 1,700 participants.

=== October ===
- 3 October – Singapore Management University (SMU) has boosted patrols, CCTV cameras, and installed warning signs to deter sexual harassment. Other measures include revising disciplinary actions, setting up a student support unit called Voices@SMU, and an online module on consent.
- 8 October
  - The Public Transport Council allows a fare increase of 7% on train and bus fares which started on 28 December, the highest percentage jump since 1998. The increase is driven by soaring energy costs. However, polytechnic students are included under student concession fares for the first time, resulting in a fare reduction.
  - Amazon.sg is launched as a local online marketplace by Amazon, making Singapore the first in Southeast Asia to get this service. This comes roughly 2 years after Amazon first made the Prime subscription service available to users in Singapore (via the Prime Now app only).
- 10 October
  - The Ministry of Health announced the world's first total advertising ban of packaged drinks with very high sugar content and colour-coded labels indicating drinks as "healthy", "neutral" and "unhealthy" respectively. The labels are compulsory for "unhealthy" drinks, while optional for "healthy" ones. These measures will take effect from 2020, after a public consultation favouring these two measures out of four possible options.
  - Dyson announced that it will not proceed with the electric car project after the project was found not to be "commercially viable". This comes a year after Dyson announced its intention to make these cars in Singapore by 2021.
- 15 October – The Singapore River Bridges (Cavenagh Bridge, Anderson Bridge and Elgin Bridge) are collectively gazetted as a National Monument, in addition to a fund boost for conservation.
- 17 October – Singapore's first fully electric public minibuses were launched.
- 20 October – Sentosa Merlion is closed, with the four shops closing the following day.
- 22 October
  - Scoot moves from Terminal 2 to Terminal 1 of Changi Airport, first announced on 15 November 2018. The move aims to facilitate growth and enhance customer experience.
  - ST Engineering launches the Strobo Series 12 autonomous bus. A public trial on Jurong Island will take place from the middle of next year.
  - NTUC FairPrice, Kopitiam, and NTUC Foodfare will be housed under a new NTUC FairPrice Group to enhance affordability.
- 24 October
  - Paya Lebar Quarter, a mixed-use development by Lend Lease is officially opened.
  - Public bus drivers will be trained to operate autonomous buses after a MOU is signed.
- 27 October – Known as the Commonwealth double murders, a 22-year-old man named Gabriel Lien Goh was arrested for allegedly killing his mother and grandmother.
- 30 October – Singapore Airlines and Malaysia Airlines have proposed code-sharing of flights and sharing revenue for Singapore-Malaysia flights. The agreement includes SilkAir, Scoot and Firefly airlines. Joint promotions will also be explored.
- 31 October – The Johor Bahru–Singapore Rapid Transit System will go ahead with a 36 per cent cost cut. Details are still being worked out in preparation for a future agreement.

=== November ===
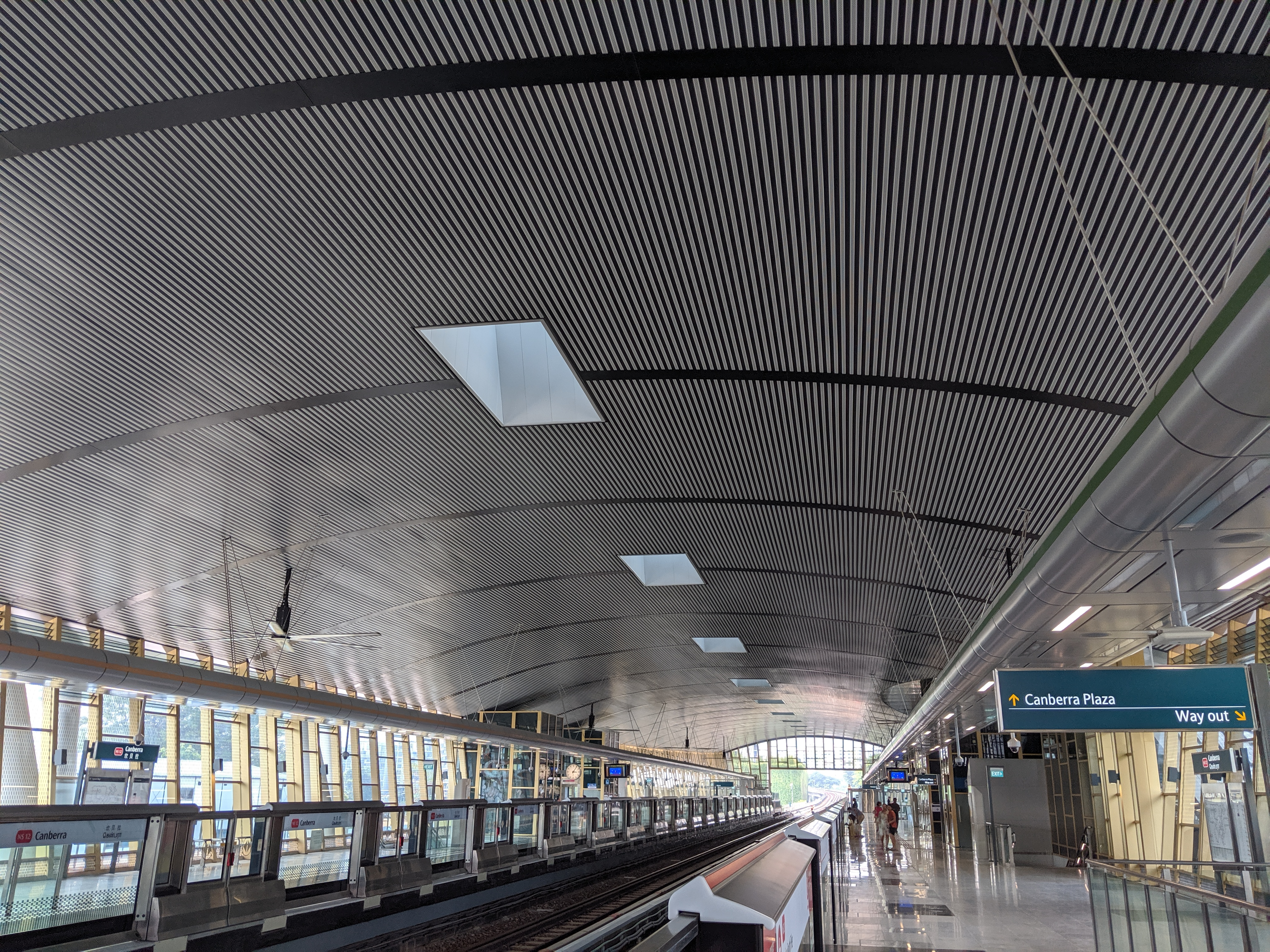
Canberra MRT station

- 1 November – The Green CHAS scheme takes effect along with other health subsidies.
- 2 November – Canberra MRT station opens, becoming the second infill station on the MRT after Dover MRT station. In addition, the station has many green features and features a 72m crossover track for resiliency.
- 4 November
  - The Ministry of Transport announced a ban on e-scooters on footpaths from 5 November to make footpaths safer, coming on the back of several accidents recently. More types of personal mobility devices (PMDs) will be banned from the first quarter of 2020 like hoverboards and electric unicycles. The ban will not apply to bicycles or personal mobility aids being used on footpaths. In addition, licence applications for PMD sharing services will be rejected and no new applications will be accepted after safety concerns raised. After feedback that the ban will affect food delivery riders' livelihoods, a new grant to exchange e-scooters for e-bikes is announced four days later.
  - Changi Airport announces the temporary closure of Runway 2 from 25 October 2020, with Runway 3 replacing it as part of the Terminal 5 project to have a three-runway system.
- 13 November – The 24-hour Pollutant Standards Index briefly hits unhealthy levels, at 101 in the east at 10am and later at 105 in the south at 7pm.
- 15 November – The NTUC announced two schemes for essentials and training for PMD riders affected by the footpath ban.
- 21 November
  - CapitaLand, Ascott REIT, and City Developments Limited announced the redevelopment of Liang Court into a mixed-use, integrated development with a condominium, a mall, a hotel and serviced apartment. The development will open in stages from 2024.
  - Carousell agrees to merge with 701Search (a Telenor company).
- 23 November – A new polyclinic will be built in Kaki Bukit by 2025. In addition, Tengah Polyclinic will be located in an integrated development.
- 25 November
  - A correction notice is issued over a Facebook post by Brad Bowyer, the first under POFMA. He has since complied with it.
  - The NS Hub starts construction, opening from 2023. The Hub will have green features and smart technology, and will be open to the public with sports facilities, food outlets and a childcare centre.
- 27 November – Biopolis will be expanded with Phase 6 to cater for biotechnology start-ups, which will be completed by mid-2022. At the same time, NSG BioLabs is launched.
- 28 November – A correction notice is issued over a post by States Times Review over false statements. However, the owner of the site, Alex Tan said he would not comply with the order. A day later, Facebook is told to insert the notice, which it did.
- 30 November – 11 December – Singapore participated at the 2019 Southeast Asian Games in the Philippines.

=== December ===
- 1 December – The Home Team Science and Technology Agency (HTX) is formed to harness technologies for Singapore's security. A day later, HTX is launched with new technologies unveiled.
- 3 December
  - A new recording of Majulah Singapura is released on its 60th anniversary with improvements in sound quality, being 5 seconds shorter than the 2001 version.
  - On the same day, Ramli Sarip's rendition of Majulah Singapura is released as a music video.
- 4 December – The Ministry of Transport announced that the Cross Island MRT line will run directly under the Central Catchment Nature Reserve as it is cheaper, hence resulting in lower energy consumption.
- 6 December – The 140m-long Mandai Wildlife Bridge is launched to allow safe animal crossings as part of Mandai's redevelopment. A 10-year reforestation plan is also released.
- 7 December – The Outram Community Hospital opens next to Singapore General Hospital, featuring facilities resembling public estates.
- 11 December – The new MRT map is launched with the Circle MRT line as a focal point, prominent landmarks to orientate commuters and QR codes containing an online fare calculator and downloadable maps. In addition, new directional signs will be used starting from the Thomson–East Coast MRT line.
- 14 December – The Singapore Democratic Party is issued correction notices for two Facebook posts and an online article. It complies with the notices a day later.
- 16 December – Opposition politician Lim Tean is issued a correction notice over a Facebook post. He complies with it soon after.
- 29 December - The fatal car accident occurred along the car park exit beside Lucky Plaza. The SUV male driver was arrested for causing death to two Filipino domestic workers while having a Christmas gathering along the pavement.

== Deaths ==
- 23 January – Aloysius Pang, former Mediacorp artiste (b. 1990).
- 3 February – Ben Goi, son of 'Popiah King' Sam Goi (b. 1975).
- 3 March – Lee Wen, performance artist (b. 1957).
- 8 March – Tow Siang Hwa, former gynaecologist at Kandang Kerbau Hospital and church pastor (b. 1925).
- 10 March – Tong Yek Suan, musician and busker (b. 1971).
- 5 April – Sydney Brenner, Honorary Citizen of Singapore and biologist (b. 1927).
- 31 May – Tjong Yik Min, former director of the Internal Security Department (b. 1952).
- 1 June – Ani Yudhoyono, 6th First Lady of Indonesia (b. 1952).
- 24 June – He Jin, novelist (b. 1935).
- 2 July – Satheesh Noel Gobidass, murder victim of the Orchard Towers murder (b. 1988).
- 3 August – P. Suppiah, lawyer (b. 1930).
- 6 August – Julai Tan, violinist (b. 1925).
- 12 August – Frank Tsao, shipping and textiles entrepreneur (b. 1925).
- 13 August – Joseph Conceicao, diplomat and former PAP Member of Parliament for Katong Constituency (b. 1924).
- 18 August – Ambrose Khaw, journalist (b. 1928).
- 19 August – Bai Yan, veteran actor (b. 1920).
- 6 September
  - Robert Mugabe, former Prime Minister and President of Zimbabwe (b. 1924).
  - Chng Seok Tin, artist and Cultural Medallion recipient (b. 1946).
- 7 September – Wong Wee Nam, opposition politician (b. 1947).
- 12 September – Lee Eng Su, co-founder of The Coconut Club (b. 1979).
- 7 October – Albert Hong, architect, businessman and philanthropist (b. 1935).
- 13 October
  - Lin Ah Leck, conductor (b. 1950).
  - Wee Toon Ouut, founder of Wee Nam Kee Chicken Rice (b. 1938).
- 22 October – Subaraj Rajathurai, nature guide and wildlife consultant (b. 1963).
- 25 October – Janet Yee, social worker and children rights' advocate (b. 1934).
- 26 October – Desmond Lim, Dyan-Mac founder (b. 1958).
- 8 November – Izz Fayyaz Zayani Ahmad, murder victim of the Yishun infant murder (b. 2019).
- 16 November – Zeng Guo Yuan, former Singaporean businessman, philanthropist, politician, author and acupuncturist (b. 1953).
- 29 November – G. Muthukumarasamy, trade unionist (b. 1951).
- 11 December – Ann Wee, pioneer of social work education (b. 1926).
- 13 December – J.A. Halim, actor (b. 1948).
- 14 December
  - Lin Liyun, actress (b. 1961)
  - Choo Keng Kwang, painter (b. 1931).
- 22 December – Samantha Lee, Singapore Idol contestant (b. 1991).
