= High-rise littering =

Throwing objects from high floors

High-rise littering occurs when people throw items from high-rise buildings or allow them to fall from a height. In addition to the general harms of littering, high-rise littering can endanger people on the ground.

Items thrown often include everyday waste such as cigarette butts, used tissue paper, or leftover food; food waste can dirty the windows and laundry of downstairs neighbours and attract animals. Soiled items such as used diapers or sanitary pads also pose hygiene concerns.

Some cases involve larger, heavier items such as bottles, furniture, or household appliances, which pose serious danger to passers-by and have caused deaths and injuries. Items accelerate when thrown from a height, making them more dangerous. For example, a 450 g (0.99 lb) football, or soccer ball, can reach 90 km/h (56 mph) if thrown from the 20th floor and can seriously injure a person below.

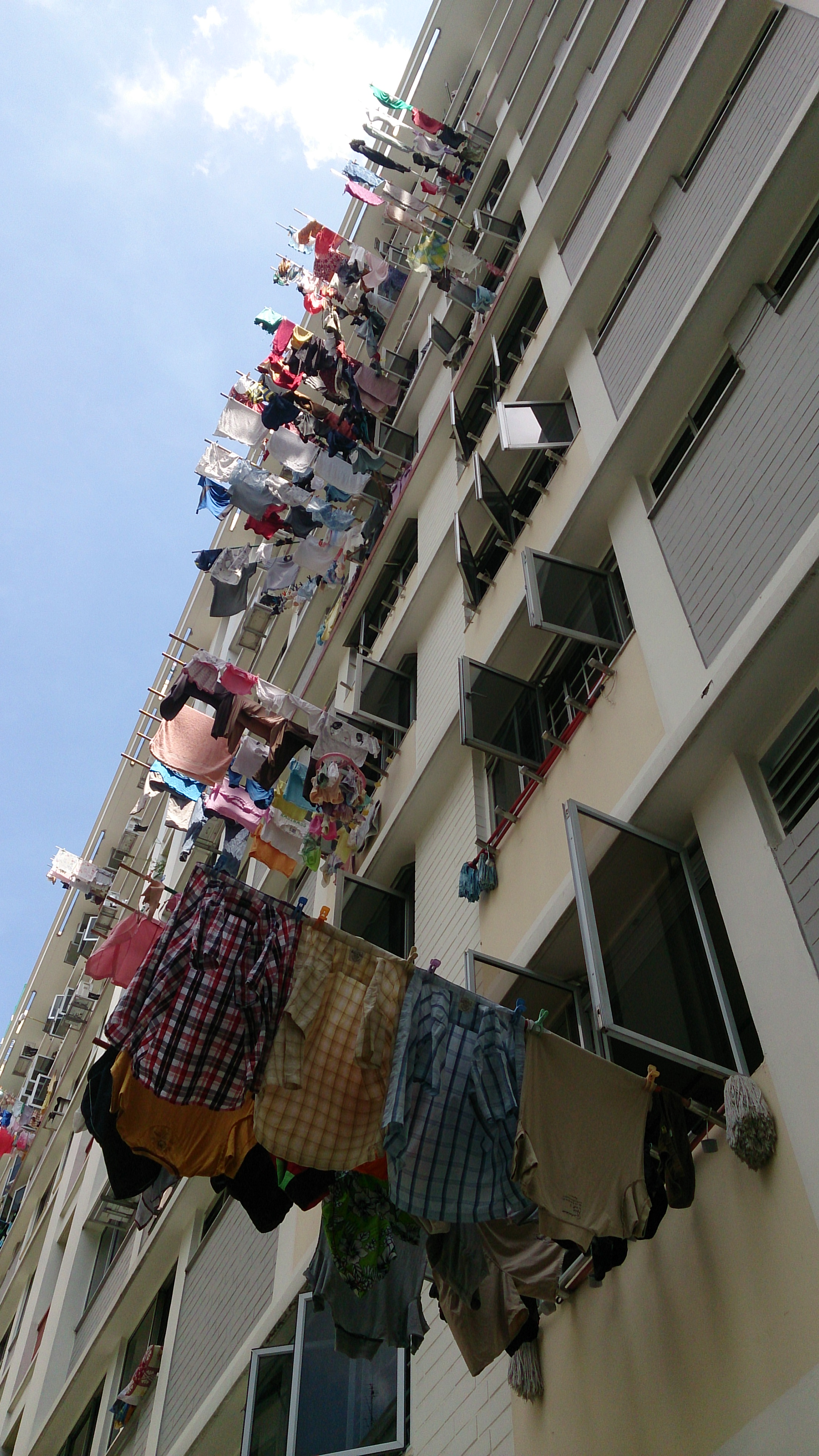
Many Singaporeans dry their laundry outside their windows on bamboo poles. If the poles are used inappropriately, such as by placing them horizontally across other poles or by hanging items from the pole holders, this can create the risk of killer litter. Laundry can also be dirtied by food waste thrown from above.

The term killer litter is widely used in Singapore to describe dangerous cases, such as those involving bulky items; in 2014, media reported that People's Action Party (PAP)-run town councils received about 2,200 complaints about high-rise littering each year, of which half were described as "potential killer litter". This term was coined in 1984, the year that Singapore's Housing and Development Board (HDB) launched a major campaign against the phenomenon. It has also been used in English-language reporting in China, Malaysia and Hong Kong, and was added to the Oxford English Dictionary in 2016, defined as "objects thrown or falling from high-rise buildings, endangering people below".

The HDB and Singaporean town councils also use "killer litter" to describe items allowed to fall through negligence rather than intentionally thrown, such as when items are placed on or hung above ledges, or inappropriately placed on the bamboo poles that many Singaporeans use to dry their laundry outside the windows of public housing apartments. Action against this form of unintentional killer litter was part of the HDB's original 1984 campaign; residents with dangerously placed items were required to remove them or face penalties, which continues to be enforced today.

== Around the world ==
=== China ===
In November 2019, China's Supreme People's Court issued a guideline calling for harsher punishments for high-rise littering, particularly for repeat offenders, offenders who failed to stop when asked, or offenders who perpetrated the act in crowded areas. Xinhuanet wrote that offenders "whose intentional high-rise littering activities have not caused serious consequences but are sufficient to endanger public safety" would be convicted of endangering public security and sentenced to three to 10 years of imprisonment.

China's civil law calls for all homeowners in a building to share responsibility if the high-rise litterer cannot be identified; however, this provision is controversial and rarely enforced. China's criminal law allows life imprisonment or even the death penalty if high-rise litterers cause death, serious injury, or "serious damage to public or private property". From mid-2016 to 2018, 31 criminal cases about high-rise littering went to court (half of which involved deaths), as well as 1,200 civil cases (30% of which involved personal injury).

In July 2019, a grocery store owner was killed when a 10-year-old boy threw a fire extinguisher from the 6th floor of a building in Guiyang; the boy was not prosecuted due to his age. Other incidents reported involved "a bicycle, stroller and even a kitchen knife". The South China Morning Post quoted a Shanghai resident who was hit by falling dog faeces; after he reported his case, office staff began daily patrols with loudspeakers at the building to warn residents not to litter.

=== Germany ===
German media has described high-rise littering in Berlin as recurrent. In 2024, multiple people threw a concrete block from a 15th-floor balcony, narrowly missing a resident below. The same year, two men threw a television and a bicycle from the eighth floor, and multiple people threw full bottles from a building, which landed next to a four-year-old girl. Other cases involved a shopping trolley, an e-scooter and a metal grid, metal rods, a bag of stones, furniture, dishes, a cupboard door, and a washing machine, which landed beside a passer-by.

=== Hong Kong ===
Hong Kong police said that they received 857 reports of "falling objects" from January to September 2009, and 661 people had been injured. The cases mostly involved leftover food and unwanted household items, but other items had also been thrown such as "a television set, air conditioner, butcher's cleaver, scissors and a block of concrete". On the same day in 2010, two elderly men were hospitalised after being struck by killer litter (one by a falling stone, the other by a bag of food waste). In 2015, luggage, a fire extinguisher, a Spider-Man toy, a backpack containing money, a wooden cabinet, a hair dryer, and a "burning metal tray" were thrown from windows in two separate incidents.

=== Malaysia ===
In 2018, a 15-year-old boy was killed in southwest Kuala Lumpur by an office chair thrown from a higher floor. The South China Morning Post quoted the owner of a ground-floor shop in a public housing building, who said "not a day has gone by when she has not feared for her life" in the 12 years since she opened the shop, due to the frequency of high-rise littering; she was struck on the head by a flowerpot in 2011, and said she had seen "punctured footballs", "broken brooms", and even a ceramic sink thrown from high floors, as well as household waste from cooking splattered onto cars below.

Kuala Lumpur City Hall has taken measures to address killer litter, such as the installation of safety nets and concrete barriers to block falling objects, and the issuing of notices to public housing residents to "take note of any such behaviour". Plans were also reported to appoint more inspectors, and to give summonses and stern warnings to offending residents.

=== Singapore ===
In Singapore, high-rise littering is punishable by a jail term of up to five years, a fine, or both; offenders living in rental flats may also lose their tenancy. Offenders may also be subject to a Corrective Work Order, requiring them to clean public areas for up to 12 hours. The Housing and Development Board (HDB) also sends written notices to people who place objects hazardously in a way that creates the risk of unintentional killer litter; if they fail to remove the objects, they may be subject to fines.

In 2015, the Singapore High Court commented that killer litter must be "severely curtailed quickly" and harshly deterred because the majority of Singaporeans live in high-rise buildings, and prosecutors have also made this argument. 77.4% of Singaporean households live in public HDB flats, and another 17.7% in condominiums and other apartments.

High-rise littering has been discussed in the Parliament of Singapore. In 2022, Minister for Sustainability and the Environment Grace Fu said that complaints about high-rise littering had doubled from 16,000 per year before 2019 to 32,000 in 2021; 54% of those cases involved cigarette butts, and the offender could not be identified in 15% of cases.

In 2023, Singapore strengthened anti–killer litter enforcement by introducing a "presumption of guilt" clause. This clause stipulates that if an act of high-rise littering is proven to have come from a specific flat, the owner(s) of that flat will be presumed to have been guilty, unless they respond within 14 days to prove they were not responsible (such as that they were not home or could not have been responsible, or that someone else was "reasonably believed" to be responsible). This presumption of guilt only applies if the littering is first proven to have come from a particular flat.

Some cases have involved large items such as beer bottles, a rice cooker, a suitcase, bicycles, metal pots, a computer CPU and monitor, a sofa, a mattress, and a television and soundbar. Some of these offenders were intoxicated and/or emotionally upset due to personal issues.

Some cases have caused injuries and deaths. In 2014, a retiree was seriously injured when a teenage boy threw a bicycle wheel from the 14th floor of a block; she needed emergency spinal surgery, and died less than a month later. The boy had previously thrown a brick, ceramic tiles, and a 5 kg dumbbell from the building, and suspended a water dispenser from the 12th floor with a rope. He was sentenced to three years' probation, including one year in the Singapore Boys' Hostel, and 200 hours of community service. In 2019, an Australian man in Singapore threw a wine bottle from the 7th floor of a condominium, killing an elderly man and seriously injuring his wife. The perpetrator was sentenced to five and a half years in prison, and the judge noted that his offences were "religiously aggravated", as they were motivated by anti-Muslim sentiment.

== See also ==
- Sidewalk shed
