= 2020 in Singapore =

- Decades: 2000s; 2010s; 2020s
- See also: Other events of 2020; Timeline of Singaporean history

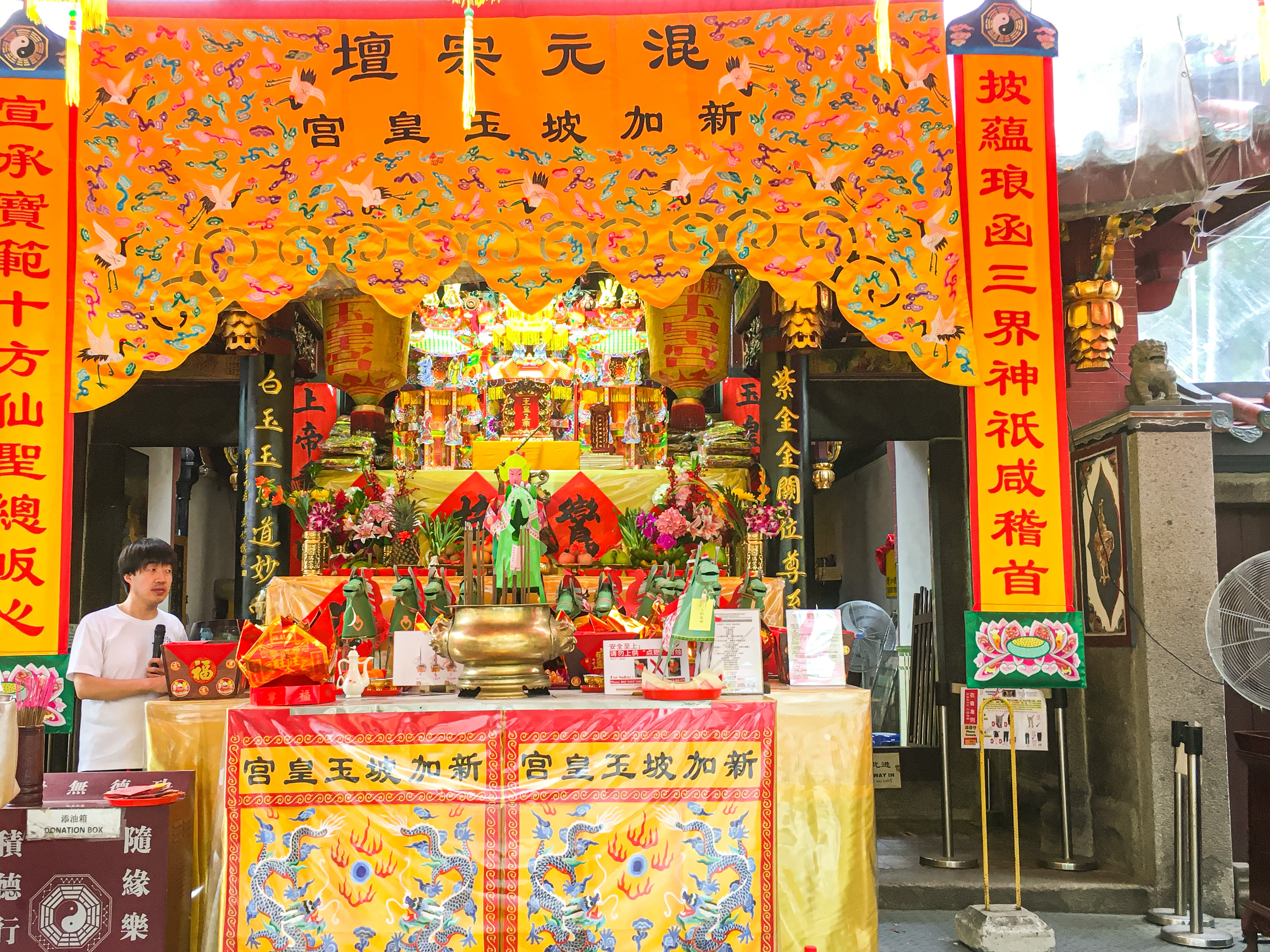
Singaporean celebration of the Chinese New Year

The following lists events that happened during 2020 in the Republic of Singapore.

== Incumbents ==
- President: Halimah Yacob
- Prime Minister: Lee Hsien Loong

== Events ==
Below, events for the COVID-19 pandemic in Singapore have the "CP" prefix.

=== January ===
- 1 January
  - The smoking age increases to 20.
  - The Goods and Services Tax extends to digital services.
  - The Criminal Law Reform Act comes into force, amending laws in the Penal Code with a new fire offence to prevent improper disposal of lighted materials. Amendments to the Protection from Harassment Act also come into force.
  - Keppel Bay Tower becomes Singapore's first commercial building to be fully solar-powered.
- 2 January – CP: The Ministry of Health (MOH) issues a health advisory and implements temperature checks for passengers arriving at Changi Airport from Wuhan the following day.
- 3 January
  - Paul Leslie Quirk, a schizophrenic Australian, is arrested at his condominium at Compassvale, accused of killing his Singaporean wife Christina Khoo Gek Hwa using a mop stick and fatally throwing his dog from the balcony. He is later found guilty of a charge, reduced from murder, of culpable homicide not amounting to murder, as he had suffered a relapse of his schizophrenia during the crime, which made him believe that Khoo was a demon. On 24 May 2021, he is sentenced to 10 years' imprisonment.
  - An appeal by website States Times Review to cancel a POFMA (Note: Full name: Protection from Online Falsehoods and Manipulation Act 2019) order is rejected. Prior to the order, one of the claims made by the website was that one person was arrested and another put under police investigation for revealing the religious affiliation of Rachel Ong, a member of the governing People's Action Party (PAP).
  - The Singapore Democratic Party (SDP) appeals to cancel POFMA orders issued the previous month, a day after it defended the Facebook posts and online article that led to said orders. The request is rejected three days later.
- 4 January
  - The Sembawang Hot Spring Park, the only natural hot spring in Singapore, reopens with refreshed facilities.
  - CP: The first suspected case of COVID-19 is reported. It is later proven negative and to instead be a case of respiratory syncytial virus.
- 6 January
  - Eunoia Junior College moves to its new campus in Bishan, making it Singapore's first high-rise junior college. It is also integrated with the future Bishan North Community Club.
  - The Healthcare Services Act is passed to better licence new and evolving healthcare models instead of only using premises, not allowing co-location of licensed and unlicensed services unless with approval and if services complement licensed ones, and allowing MOH to temporarily take over operators in financial trouble. The law will be implemented in three phases from early 2021 to end 2022, being clinic laboratories to private ambulances and clinics, with the last phase hospitals and new health treatments. Meanwhile, mandatory contributions to the National Electronic Health Record are still deferred until enhancements are completed.
- 8 January – The SDP appeals its December 2019 POFMA orders in court in its first such challenge and requests that, in the public interest, the case be held in open court. The request for an open hearing is rejected in view of rules. After the hearing, the Attorney-General's Chambers (AGC) states that the SDP made misleading statements; the party promises to subsequently correct the statements.
- 9–22 January – Three athletes from Singapore compete at the 2020 Winter Youth Olympics in Lausanne, Switzerland, the first time Singapore participates in the competition.
- 10 January
  - The United States government allows the sale of up to 12 F-35B jets to Singapore.
  - CP: The second suspected case is reported and tests negative.
- 14 January – The Ministry of Manpower (MOM) announces stiffer penalties against companies which discriminate against Singaporeans in their hiring processes. Such companies face bans on applying new work passes lasting between 12 and 24 months, bans on renewing work passes, as well as prosecution for false declarations of fair practices. Five companies have been taken to task with a logistics company the first to be charged. Measures against employment agencies with discriminatory practices are planned as well.
- 15 January – The National Environment Agency warns of a dengue outbreak caused by the DENV-3 strain, not seen in Singapore the last three decades.
- 16 January –
  - It is announced that Changi Airport Terminal 2 will undergo upgrading works to create a nature-inspired space and increase capacity, with completion scheduled by 2024. Two flip boards displaying flight information will be retired and more dining options will be created.
  - CP: The third suspected case is reported and tests negative.
- 17 January
  - Construction starts on the Punggol Digital District, with a new Open Digital Platform powering the area upon completion.
  - CP: Two suspected cases are reported, bringing the total number to five; both test negative.
- 18 January – CP: The sixth suspected case is reported and tests negative.
- 20 January – CP: MOH extends temperature screening for all travellers coming from China and isolates individuals with symptoms in hospital. The seventh suspected case is also reported, later negative.
- 21 January – CP: MOH extends isolation measures to all travellers coming from China with symptoms from the next day.
- 22 January
  - Human rights organisation Lawyers for Liberty (LFL) and three parties who shared its posts receive POFMA notices for LFL's allegations on the death penalty. All parties comply except for LFL, which is thus blocked by the Infocomm Media Development Authority (IMDA) the following day. On 24 January, LFL sues Singaporean minister K. Shanmugam in Malaysia. An appeal by The Online Citizen (TOC) against its POFMA order is rejected on the same day.
  - CP: Three suspected cases are detected, causing MOH to form a multi-ministry taskforce on the virus. An advisory against non-essential travel to Wuhan is issued.
- 23 January – CP: The first case is confirmed, while preliminary tests are positive for another. Border control measures are tightened, with measures extended to land and sea checkpoints the following day. The MOH expands its prior advisory against travel to Wuhan to cover all of Hubei province. Scoot cancels flights to Wuhan between 23 and 26 January over the virus outbreak. Schools ask parents to declare their travel plans and monitor their children's health, with other measures to ensure student safety. The Ministry of Defence (MINDEF) issues two medical advisories to service personnel.
- 24 January – CP: The Immigration and Checkpoints Authority and Maritime and Port Authority of Singapore implement temperature-taking from noon. Two cases are later confirmed, bringing the total to 3. Several holiday chalets and student hostels will be prepared as government quarantine centres. In addition, several companies have since taken more precautions against the virus. A Scoot flight was delayed for six hours after one passenger was sent for further tests, with the flight returning to Singapore three days later.
- 25 January – CP: No cases are confirmed. In addition, MOH only allows two visitors per hospital patient.
- 26 January – CP: Another case is confirmed, bringing the total to 4.
- 27 January
  - CP: HardwareZone is issued a correction notice over an online post falsely claiming a death in Singapore from the coronavirus. The post was deleted a day before the issuance of the notice.
  - CP: A 14-day leave of absence (LOA) is imposed for students and teachers, as well as those working with vulnerable sectors like pre-schools, healthcare and eldercare returning from mainland China with students doing home-based learning instead. Temperature screening for all flights will start from 29 January with additional checks on flights from China and passengers from Hubei. In addition, people who went to China the last 14 days will need to fill health and travel declarations and monitor their health with temperature checks for two weeks. MOH will now advise against travel to mainland China. Hostels in National University of Singapore, Nanyang Technological University, and Singapore Management University will also be designated as quarantine facilities.
  - CP: Another case is confirmed, bringing the total to 5.
  - CP: Taxi companies will waive cab rental fees should drivers get quarantined.
- 28 January
  - The Payment Services Act comes into force.
  - CP: Two cases are confirmed, bringing the total to 7. Several new measures are announced, with quarantine for those returning from Hubei and those of higher risk, and no entry for those from Hubei and visitors who have been there for the last 14 days, starting from noon the next day. All forms of visas for Hubei travellers are suspended immediately. Those self-employed under quarantine will receive a $100 allowance per day, and home quarantine options are available. Hospital bills will be paid by MOH for all suspected and confirmed cases.
  - CP: The Ministry of Manpower rejects new applications for workers from Hubei immediately, with existing applications unaffected.
  - CP: Facebook is issued a correction notice over a post falsely claiming the closure of Woodlands station due to the virus.
  - CP: NSmen who went to China will be given 14 days leave with all appointments rescheduled.
- 29 January
  - CP: Three cases are confirmed, bringing the total to 10.
  - CP: Singapore Airlines will suspend layovers from the next day for cabin crew and pilots to Beijing and Shanghai. Jetstar Asia will suspend flights to three cities in China until 31 March.
  - CP: Enterprise Singapore advised companies to defer trips to China and avoid Hubei province, along with travel, health checks and continuity plans. It will also work with Singapore Business Federation on a continuity plan guide for companies.
  - CP: Outward Bound Singapore camps in Pulau Ubin will be designated quarantine facilities.
- 30 January
  - Mediacorp renames its digital media platforms Toggle, MeRadio and MeClub to meWatch, meListen and meRewards respectively.
  - The Ministry of Communications and Information will no longer exempt social media platforms, search engines and Internet intermediaries from following the Protection from Online Falsehoods and Manipulation Act (POFMA) from the next day, given the coronavirus situation.
  - CP: 92 Singaporeans reached Singapore after being evacuated from Wuhan, with some staying behind due to symptoms.
  - CP: All households will get four surgical masks each from 1 February, meant for use when unwell.
  - CP: The Ministry of Trade and Industry (MTI) asked Deen Express to explain their mask prices, with Lazada, Carousell and Qoo10 ordered to reveal mask profiteers.
  - CP: Three cases are confirmed, bringing the total to 13.
- 31 January
  - The first stage of the Thomson–East Coast MRT line (spanning from Woodlands North to Woodlands South) opens. In addition, a new MRT map is rolled out at all stations with the Circle MRT line as a focus.
  - Cold Stone Creamery closes after being in Singapore for 10 years.
  - CP: Singapore Airlines and SilkAir will reduce China flights for February, with Scoot reducing flights to eight China cities and suspending 11 others. Scoot later announced a suspension of all China flights from 8 February due to the worsening situation.
  - CP: Two correction notices are issued over five infected Singaporeans and Singapore running out of masks respectively, since proven false.
  - CP: Those from mainland China and visitors who have been there for the last 14 days are not allowed entry from 1 February at 11.59pm. Holders of China passports may be allowed provided they did not visit China recently. All forms of visas for China travellers are suspended immediately. Those returning from China will be put on a 14-day leave of absence.
  - CP: The Ministry of Manpower rejects new applications for workers from China immediately, with existing applications unaffected. Work pass holders who return from China will be placed under a 14-day leave of absence.
  - CP: Three cases are confirmed including the first Singaporean, bringing the total to 16.
  - The final three littoral mission vessels (LMVs) are fully operational, thus completing the replacement of all Fearless-class patrol vessels. They join the existing five LMVs in service.

=== February ===
- 1 February
  - CP: A tripartite care package is put up for quarantined taxi and private-hire drivers with an additional $100 from companies and another $200 if they are union members.
  - CP: More flights to China are suspended by Singapore Airlines including those on earlier dates. Jetstar Asia follows suit with all flights to China stopped.
  - CP: Two cases are confirmed, bringing the total to 18.
- 2 February – CP: The Singapore Tourism Board announced measures to help the tourism industry, including funding 50 percent of cleaning fees of up to $10,000 and $20,000 for suspected and confirmed cases respectively, along with waiving licence fees for hotels, travel agents and tour guides for 2020. No new cases are confirmed as well.
- 3 February –
  - CP: Several measures are announced to help curb the novel coronavirus, including an assistance package for affected areas in China, as well as health strategies and the various scenarios that could play out in the outbreak. In addition, 240 suspect cases are negative with 43 pending, as well as 524 under quarantine (222 in Government facilities and 302 at home). Practices like shunning those on leave of absences are condemned, and calls to ensure judicious use of masks are emphasised. More aid is planned to cushion the impact of the virus.
  - CP: No new cases are confirmed for the second day. At the same time, the Government announced actions against errant landlords who evict based on nationality and placed either on quarantine or leave of absences, with restrictions and permanent bans on renting to foreign work pass holders.
- 4 February – CP: Six cases are confirmed, including the first cases of local transmission at Yong Thai Hang involving four people. This brings the total to 24.
- 5 February – The Singapore Democratic Party lost the appeal, with the court ruling that a statement has to be proven false by the Government after a correction is issued.
- 6 February
  - Plans for Sungei Kadut Eco-District are launched. Under the plan, traditional industries will be rejuvenated and new industries like agri-tech and environmental technology are encouraged to set up there. A new facility called Kranji Green will be set up for recycling efforts by 2021. The District will also have retail facilities and more greenery. Another 200 hectares of land will be set aside for future uses. Meanwhile, two estates in Yishun and Kallang-Kolam Ayer are planned for rejuvenation.
  - Hyundai Rotem is awarded a contract for Jurong Region MRT line trains. These trains will be equipped with emergency batteries for cases of power failure. All MRT lines are revealed to reach 1 million MBKF (mean kilometres before failure) mark.
- 7 February – CP: The Disease Outbreak Response System Condition (DORSCON) level is raised from Yellow to Orange after more cases with unclear origins surfaced.
- 16 February – The National Environment Agency launches the "SG Clean" campaign to improve hygiene standards amid the COVID-19 outbreak, with a "SG Clean" quality mark to be progressively rolled out to sectors with high human traffic.
- 17 February – A new inter-agency taskforce on family violence is announced to tackle the issue more effectively. Some ideas are being planned, including expanding Home Team CARES to family violence survivors, a national anti-violence hotline, and closer collaboration between the Government, private and public sectors. A children's book on family violence is also launched.

=== March ===
- 2 March – The Maritime Experiential Museum and Crane Dance closed as part of plans to revamp Resorts World Sentosa. In their place will be a new Singapore Oceanarium and waterfront promenade.
- 4 March – Intellectual Property Office of Singapore chief Daren Tang is nominated for director-general of World Intellectual Property Organization after winning a vote against China's preferred candidate. The appointment is confirmed on 8 May, making Tang the first Singaporean to head a United Nations agency, with the position starting 1 October.
- 9 March - Tekka Place, the new shopping centre in Little India is officially opened.
- 10 March – An extension of the Cross Island MRT line is announced. Spanning 7.3 km (4.5 miles) from Pasir Ris to Punggol, the four-station extension will be completed by 2031.
- 13 March – General Elections: The Electoral Boundaries Review Committee report is released. The 14th parliament will consist of 93 members from 31 constituencies (14 Single Member Constituencies and 17 Group Representation Constituencies), up from 89 seats from the current 29 constituencies. In addition, six-member GRCs will be abolished, with the maximum being five MPs in each GRC.
- 21 March – CP: The first two deaths are confirmed.
- 27 March – CP: Singapore invokes the Infectious Diseases (COVID-19) movement control law, banning entertainment outlets, nightclubs and tuition centres, and restricting remaining building crowd density such as MRT and LRT stations, and shopping centres to one person per 16 square metres of space, failing which they will be asked to close.
- 31 March – Liang Court, a shopping mall in Clarke Quay, ceases operation.

=== April ===
- 1 April – All e-scooters must undergo mandatory inspection.
- 3 April
  - CP: Prime Minister Lee Hsien Loong announced a "circuit breaker" to curb COVID from 7 April until at least 4 May. All non-essential workplaces, including Singapore Pools, will be closed during this period. Schools will move to home-based learning, and preschools will close except to provide services for parents without alternative care arrangements, from 8 April to 4 May.
  - The Ministry of Home Affairs announced plans to form the Gambling Regulatory Authority of Singapore by 2021 to regulate all gambling activities here, expanding from the Casino Regulatory Authority of Singapore (CRA); which regulated only casinos. It will also absorb MHA's Gambling Regulatory Unit, along with other relevant agencies. This comes in tandem with plans to consolidate all gambling-related laws for efficiency.
- 21 April
  - CP: "Circuit breaker" measures are extended until 1 June.
  - In preparation for the rebranding of the Singapore Corporation of Rehabilitative Enterprises, new training academies are announced to help prison inmates land a career after release. The initiative will first start in two industries, being precision engineering and media.

=== May ===
- 1 May – The Singapore Corporation of Rehabilitative Enterprises is rebranded to Yellow Ribbon Singapore to reaffirm their resolve in rehabilitating ex-offenders.
- 29 May – Two opposition members announce the registration of Red Dot United, subsequently approved on 15 June.

=== June ===
- 2 June – Phase 1 of reopening starts. Schools and offices reopen with stricter measures put in place, households are allowed to welcome 2 visitors whom are family-related at a time. Places of worship reopen only for private worship only. Wearing of masks are made mandatory for all outings except for those who have health issues or are young children whom can wear face shields. Those doing vigorous exercise need not wear any masks or face shields.
- 5 June – All fishery port activities will be consolidated to Jurong Fishery Port with renovations by 2023 following declining shipments at Senoko Fishery Port, resulting in the latter's future closure. At the same time, Singapore Food Agency will review the fresh food wholesale industry with studies to finish in 2022.
- 9 June – Lotte Duty Free takes over DFS Group's Changi Airport liquor and tobacco stores with plans for a revamp soon. This comes after the latter ended its 39-year tenancy due to a challenging environment.
- 19 June – Phase 2 kicks in easing more restrictions. Households can receive 5 visitors at a time. Retail, dine in, home-based and tuition/enrichment classes are allowed to resume with safety measures put in place. Recreational and sports facilities reopen for members of the public to use.
- 23 June – General Elections: The 13th Parliament is dissolved in a televised speech by Prime Minister Lee Hsien Loong, outlining future challenges and stability of COVID-19 cases as a reason to hold elections.
- 24 June – Lee Hsien Yang joins Progress Singapore Party.
- 25 June
  - Former Prime Minister Goh Chok Tong announced his retirement from politics after 44 years.
  - Former Workers Party chief Low Thia Khiang announced his retirement, along with MPs Chen Show Mao and Png Eng Huat.
  - Singaporeans First founder Tan Jee Say announced its dissolution.
- 26 June – Minister for Transport Khaw Boon Wan announced his retirement from politics after 19 years.
- 30 June – Nomination day for the General Elections: No constituencies are returned via walkover, the second such general election since 2015.

=== July ===
- 1 July
  - New tobacco measures collectively known as the SP measures take effect, including mandatory standardised packaging and no logos, among others.
  - New UL2272 certification rules for personal mobility devices take effect to prevent fires.
  - More Phase 2 reopening measures kick in with museums, cinemas, public libraries and tourist attractions such as Marina Bay Sands and Singapore Zoo reopening to the public. Places of worship are allowed to have 50 or fewer people in at a time.
- 10 July – Polling day for the General Elections:
  - Polls closed two hours later at 10pm, as opposed to 8pm usually due to crowds.
  - The ruling People's Action Party (PAP), led by Lee Hsien Loong, retains its majority in the elections with 83 out of 93 seats, with an overall vote share of 61.24%.
  - Main opposition Workers' Party (WP) wins the remaining 10 seats from its current constituencies (Aljunied GRC and Hougang SMC) and the new Sengkang GRC, making it the second GRC won by the opposition.
- 11 July – Prime Minister Lee Hsien Loong announced that Pritam Singh will be officially designated the Leader of the Opposition in view of a strong WP win. Voting procedures will be reviewed too.
- 14 July
  - The Keppel Marina East Desalination Plant is revealed to have started commercial operations since 29 June, being Singapore's fourth desalination plant.
  - Progress Singapore Party announces that Hazel Poa and Leong Mun Wai from West Coast GRC shall take up Non-Constituency Member of Parliament seats. The results are confirmed on 16 July.
- 15 July – The NS Square will have a museum on National Service, a permanent stage that will host events like National Day Parade, community sports facilities and a waterfront promenade. Construction is expected to start in March 2022 with completion by end-2025.
- 19 July – Wag and Wild waterpark was opened as a dog's water theme park in Jurong East, Singapore.
- 25 July – Prime Minister Lee Hsien Loong announced a new Cabinet with several rotations and replacements, as well as continuation of some Ministers to deal with the ongoing pandemic. The Ministry of Environment and Water Resources is also renamed to the Ministry of Sustainability and the Environment to focus on sustainability efforts. In addition, the National Day Rally will be replaced by a Parliamentary speech due to COVID-19, which will then be debated.
- 30 July
  - The Insolvency, Restructuring and Dissolution Act takes effect, bringing all insolvency laws into a single one.
  - A new town councils is established in Sengkang, bringing the number of town councils to 17.

=== August ===
- 1 August – HometeamNS Country Club in Khatib is progressively opened with a bowling alley, indoor shooting arena, Peranakan theme T-Play kids playground, and Adventure HQ@HometeamNS before its official opening on 10 April 2021.
- 5 August – 2020 dengue outbreak: the number of dengue fever cases reported reached 22,403, surpassing the previous record from 2013. The total for the year would eventually reach 35,315 cases, with 32 deaths recorded (also exceeding the previous record death toll, from the 2005 outbreak).
- 9 August
  - NDP 2020 takes place in decentralised venues due to COVID-19 restrictions with a morning, afternoon and evening format.
  - The design of NS Square is unveiled by Prime Minister Lee Hsien Loong in his National Day Message.
- 24 August – The 14th Parliament of Singapore opens at two locations (Parliament House and The Arts House) due to safe distancing measures. Speaker Of Parliament Tan Chuan Jin was elected for the role once again whereas Indranee Rajah took the role of Leader Of The House.

=== September ===
- 1 September – A new PWM Mark will be introduced to recognise companies which pay lower-income workers, particularly in the food and retail industries. Negotiations are ongoing to implement PWM for waste management. In addition, the Ministry of Manpower will tighten oversight of companies to ensure locals are treated fairly for jobs and retrenchments.
- 4 September – The second phase of the Thomson–East Coast MRT line is delayed to the first quarter of 2021 due to the COVID-19 pandemic.
- 8 September – Singapore will switch to a new satellite-based Electronic Road Pricing system by 2023 with the same congestion pricing framework instead of distance charging for now. As a result, installation of new onboard units (OBUs) will start from the second half of 2021, delayed due to the COVID-19 pandemic.
- 10 September – Apple opens its third Singapore store at Marina Bay Sands. It is the first Apple Store to float on water.
- 12 September – Decathlon Experience Store at The Centrepoint is officially opened as the first two-storey outlet.
- 17 September – A cluster of rabbit hemorrhagic disease (RHD) of up to 11 rabbits is reported, of which eight have died. This is the first such occurrence in Singapore. Vaccines against the disease will be brought in.
- 20 September – Minister for Home Affairs K Shanmugam announced a review on gender equality issues through the "Conversations on Women Development" leading to a White Paper in the first half of 2021. This comes after a spate of voyeurism cases in universities. Among them include teaching children importance of equality with respect, as well as at home, school, workforce, anti-violence strategies, eradicating stereotypes and sexual crimes, among others.

=== October ===
- 7 October – The National Trades Union Congress will not take up the offer to operate a public golf course at Singapore Island Country Club's (SICC) Bukit due to financial constraints, with Keppel Club offered the area instead subject to conditions. A renewal for the other course is on the cards should both clubs agree to share facilities.
- 8 October – A new Enabling Mark scheme is launched by SG Enable to recognise employers who provide work opportunities for those with disabilities.
- 11 October – Changi Jurassic Mile Park that connects between Changi Airport Park connector and East Coast Park Connector is officially opened.
- 24 October – A cluster of four tuberculosis cases are found in a Hougang block, resulting in voluntary screening of former and current residents there.
- 25 October – Changi Airport closes Runway 2 temporarily for Terminal 5 works, with Runway 3 replacing it.
- 27 October – Singapore's first fully electric double decker buses are launched with an initial 10 in service.
- 30 October – Robinsons announced that it will close its last two stores in The Heeren and Raffles City, as well as in Malaysia due to weak demand.

=== November ===
- 3 November – The Monetary Authority of Singapore (MAS) announces that S$1,000 notes will no longer be issued from 1 January 2021 to fight money laundering and terrorism financing, with limited quantities of such notes available until end-December.
- 13 November
  - Punggol Coast MRT station is delayed to 2024 due to the COVID-19 pandemic.
  - A new integrated general and community hospital will be built near to Bedok North MRT station with completion around 2030, being managed by SingHealth. Plans were earlier announced in March.
- 15 November – Le Quest Mall in Bukit Batok was officially opened that consist of NTUC Fairprice Finest, Koufu, Swiss Bake, McDonald's, KFC, Pizza Hut and more.
- 20 November – The Made With Passion mark is launched by the Singapore Brand Office and Singapore Tourism Board to recognise outstanding local brands.
- 23 November – Woods Square, the new shopping mall in Woodlands that host three new retail floors and just located beside Causeway Point is opened, especially with a new Long John Silver outlet that was closed in Causeway Point in 2019.

=== December ===
- 1 December – Singaporeans were given $100 worth of SingapoRediscovers vouchers to use to visit various local attractions. This is part of the government's efforts to promote domestic tourism and revitalize the tourism industry which was hit hard by the COVID-19 pandemic since overseas leisure travel was not possible. The vouchers are valid until 30 June 2021 and are redeemed online via SingPass.
- 4 December – The Monetary Authority of Singapore awards Grab-Singtel consortium and Sea digital bank licences, with Ant Group and a consortium including Greenland Financial Holdings digital wholesale bank licences. These banks will start operations in 2022. Pending results from the pilot, possibly more digital wholesale bank licences could be provided.
- 6 December – Jurong East Bus Interchange is relocated to a new interim facility due to the construction of Jurong Region Line and future Integrated Transport Hub.
- 12 December – FairPrice launches an unstaffed and cashless Cheers store in Our Tampines Hub with AI and facial recognition used for payments.
- 14 December
  - CP: The Pfizer–BioNTech COVID-19 vaccine is approved by the Health Sciences Authority for use as the first COVID-19 vaccine in Singapore.
  - The second phase of the Thomson–East Coast MRT line is further delayed to the third quarter of 2021. This comes after another disruption earlier this month caused by a signalling fault. Other transport projects are delayed as well.
- 16 December
  - Robinsons shuts its flagship store at The Heeren.
  - Hawker culture becomes Singapore's first Intangible Heritage on the UNESCO list.
- 18 December – Canberra Plaza, a new shopping mall directly connected to Canberra MRT station, opens.
- 28 December – Phase 3 kicks in, allowing groups of up to 8, 250 people in concerts and religious gatherings, 65% capacity in malls and attractions among other things.
- 30 December – COVID-19 vaccination in Singapore begins.

== Deaths ==
- 1 January – Ng Jui Ping, former Chief of Defence Force (b. 1948).
- 3 January – Christina Khoo Gek Hwa, a murdered victim.
- 6 January – Sarpon Muradi, oldest retired prison officer (b. 1918).
- 9 January
  - Jo Heng, lyricist (b. 1960).
  - Yong Pung How, 2nd Chief Justice of Singapore (b. 1926).
- 11 January – Donato Ferrer, founding member of the Singapore Dance Theatre, dancer (b. 1962).
- 14 January – Saidi Shariff, former PAP Member of Parliament for Kaki Bukit Constituency (b. 1940).
- 21 January – Tan Beng Yan, founder of Tyan Fashions (b. 1949).
- 3 February – Philip Chan, pastor and co-founder of halfway house The Hiding Place (b. 1950).
- 10 February – Shariff Abdul Samat, former Singapore international footballer (b. 1984).
- 11 March – Kwei Chin Pen, finger painter and Lee Kuan Yew's Chinese tutor (b. 1927).
- 3 April – Thio Gim Hock, former chief executive of OUE and Olympian (b. 1938).
- 27 April – Annabel Pennefather, athlete, lawyer (b. 1948).
- 10 May – Tay Rui Hao, victim of the Punggol Field murder (b. 1981–1982).
- 4 July – Jeremy Ng, head of general surgery at Singapore General Hospital (b. 1972).
- 9 July – Hafiz Rahim, former national footballer (b. 1984).
- 11 July – Neil Montefiore, former chief executive of StarHub and M1 (b. 1953).
- 17 July – Tony Kemal Siddique, veteran diplomat (b. 1940).
- 7 August – Rodney Seow, 1967 Singapore Grand Prix champion (b. 1935).
- 15 August – Tan Sock Kern, former principal of Singapore Chinese Girls' School (b. 1918).
- 20 August – Ngiam Tong Dow, top civil servant (b. 1937).
- 26 August – Harry Elias, founding chairperson of Criminal Legal Aid Scheme (b. 1937).
- 9 September – Tan Yong Hua, Restaurant Home chef (b. 1973).
- 6 November – Salim Moin, former footballer (b. 1961).
- 7 November – Dennis Hugh Murphy, zoologist (b. 1931).
- 8 November – Chen Meiguang, veteran actress and singer (b. 1933).
- 9 November – Unnamed 11-year-old girl, victim of the Jurong child killing (b. 2008–2009).
- 14 November – Kwek Kok Kwong, chief executive of NTUC LearningHub (b. 1967).
- 25 November – Weng Shunyu (Ka Si), songwriter (b. 1959).
- 30 November – Tan Eng Bock, former national water polo captain and coach (b. 1936).
- 19 December – Jaswant Singh Gill, former Commander of the Singapore Naval Volunteer Force (b. 1923).

=== Unknown date ===
- February – Megan Khung, Singaporean girl murdered by her mother and her boyfriend (b. 2015).
