= Yunfu Mansion =

Skyscraper in Wuxi, China

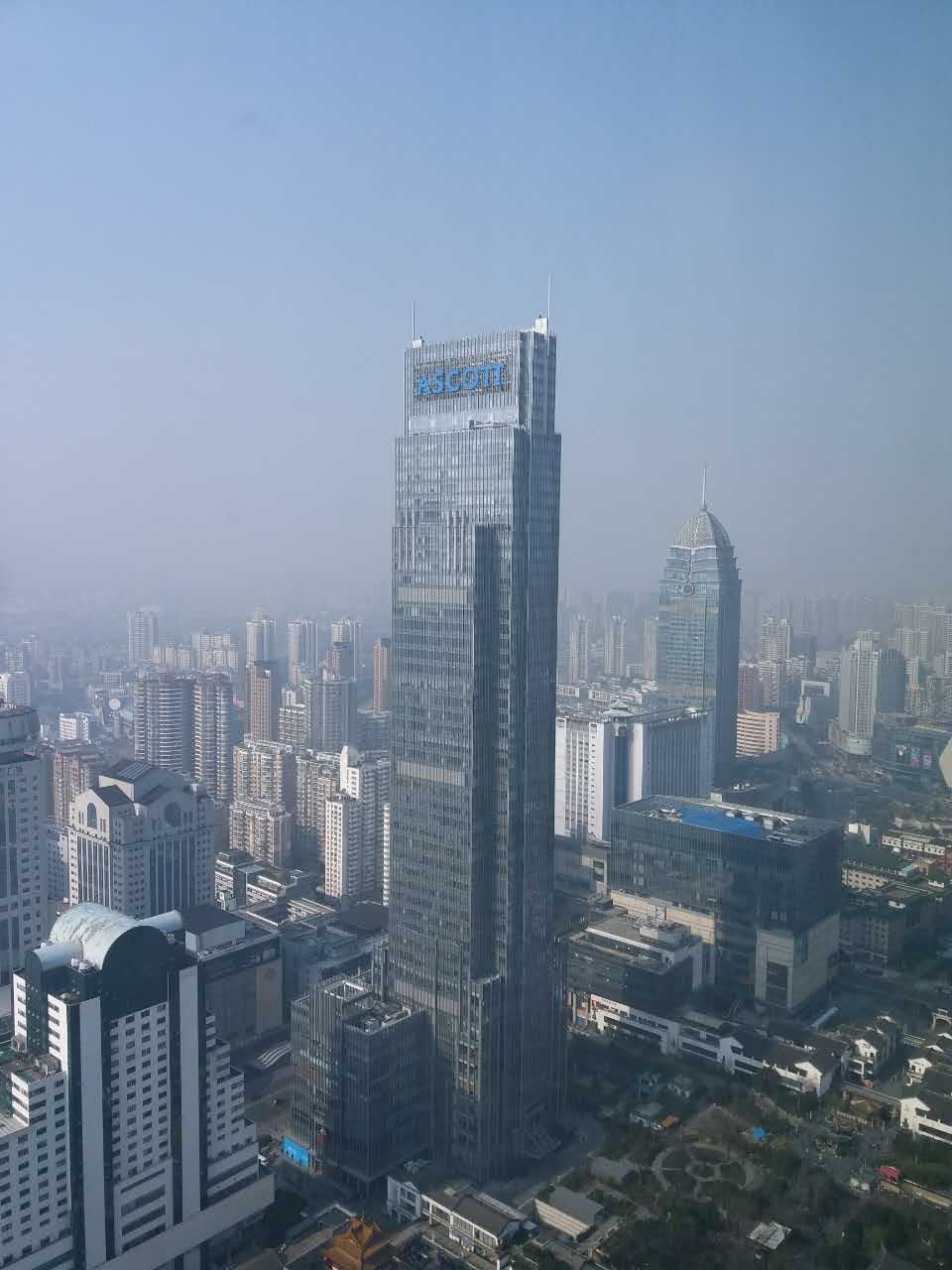

General information
- Location: Wuxi, China
- Construction started: 2011
- Completed: 2015

Height
- Height: 249 m (817 ft)

Technical details
- Floor count: 53

Yunfu Mansion is a 249 m (817 ft) skyscraper located in Wuxi, Jiangsu, China. Construction began in 2011 and ended in 2015. It is the 5th tallest building in Wuxi.

The major tenant is Ascott Wuxi Central which operates 134 serviced residence catering to business executives.

== See also ==
- List of tallest buildings in China
- List of tallest buildings in the world
