= Triple A Technologies =

Triple-A (legally Triple A Technologies Pte. Ltd.) is a global financial technology business specialising in stablecoin and local currency payments. Founded by Eric Barbier, it handles payments for merchants and cross-border transfers.

== History ==
Triple A Technologies Pte. Ltd. began its business operations in Singapore in 2020. Triple-A received a Standard Payment Institution licence from the Monetary Authority of Singapore in November 2021, covering digital payment token services. It later obtained a Major Payment Institution licence.

In 2022, Triple-A raised US$4 million in seed funding led by zVentures, the investment arm of Razer. In October 2023, it raised US$10 million Series A funding round led by Peak XV Partners and co-led by Shorooq Partners.

Farfetch was among the merchants using Triple-A's cryptocurrency payment services in 2023. In January 2024, Singapore's AXS introduced cryptocurrency payments for selected services through Triple-A. GrabPay began accepting stablecoin wallet top-ups through the same provider in March. In both cases, Triple-A converted the payments into Singapore dollars. Triple-A introduced stablecoin payouts for business transactions in 2024. In November, it partnered with Crypto.com to enable payments to online merchants. PayTop SAS, Triple-A's French subsidiary, received authorisation as a crypto-asset service provider under the European Union's Markets in Crypto-Assets (MiCA) regulation in May 2026. The company also received in-principle approval from Dubai's Virtual Assets Regulatory Authority (VARA) for broker-dealer services in June 2026.

== Regulatory licences ==
Its services include multicurrency accounts, merchant payment integrations and business payouts. In February 2026, Triple-A announced a collaboration with Mastercard Move concerning cross-border transfers for banks and other payment providers.

Triple A Technologies Pte. Ltd. holds a Major Payment Institution licence from the Monetary Authority of Singapore, covering money transfers, merchant acquisition and digital payment token services.

In France, Triple-A operates through PayTop SAS, which is authorised as a payment institution (PI) by the Autorité de contrôle prudentiel et de résolution (ACPR) and as a crypto-asset service provider by the Autorité des marchés financiers (AMF) under the European Union's Markets in Crypto-Assets (MiCA) regulation. In the United States Triple A Technologies Inc. is registered with the Financial Crimes Enforcement Network (FinCEN) as a money services business and holds money transmitter licences in multiple U.S. states. In Canada Triple A Technologies Pte. Ltd. is registered with the Financial Transactions and Reports Analysis Centre of Canada (FINTRAC) as a foreign money services business and with the Bank of Canada as a payment service provider under the Retail Payment Activities Act. In Dubai, Triple A Technologies FZCO received in-principle approval from the Virtual Assets Regulatory Authority for broker-dealer services in 2026.
