= GrabPay Wallet =

GrabPay Wallet is a digital wallet and mobile payment service operated by Grab Holdings, a Singapore-based technology company known for its Southeast Asian super-app.

The service is integrated into the Grab app and was first introduced as GrabPay Credits in 2016 as a stored-value cashless payment option for Grab rides.

GrabPay later expanded beyond ride-hailing into merchant payments, online payments, and other wallet-based services in selected markets.

In Singapore, GrabPay is operated by GPay Network (S) Pte. Ltd., which holds a Major Payment Institution licence from the Monetary Authority of Singapore under the Payment Services Act 2019.

== History ==
Grab launched GrabPay Credits in November 2016 to allow users to top up stored value and pay for rides without cash.

The wallet was later positioned as part of Grab’s broader financial services strategy as the company expanded from ride-hailing into payments, financing, insurance, and banking-related services.

In March 2018, Grab acquired Uber’s Southeast Asian operations, strengthening its regional position and giving Uber a stake in Grab.

Grab Holdings listed on Nasdaq in December 2021 under the ticker symbol GRAB through a special-purpose acquisition company merger with Altimeter Growth Corp.

== Services ==
GrabPay can be used for Grab services such as transport and delivery payments within the Grab app.

GrabPay also supports wallet payments for selected in-store and online merchants, depending on market availability.

In some markets, GrabPay supports cash-in or top-up through channels such as cards, online banking, ATMs, stores, or partner agents.

Grab also developed adjacent financial products under its broader financial technology business, including buy now, pay later services and banking partnerships in selected markets.

In 2018, Grab and Mastercard announced a partnership to issue prepaid cards linked to GrabPay, with virtual and physical card options planned for Southeast Asian users.

Grab later launched the GrabPay Card in Singapore, but announced that both the physical and digital versions would be discontinued from June 2024.

== Regulation ==
GrabPay operates under payment licences issued by regulators in its respective markets.

In Singapore, GPay Network (S) Pte. Ltd. is listed by the Monetary Authority of Singapore as a Major Payment Institution.

Grab’s Singapore payment terms state that GPay Network holds MAS licence number PS20200167 for services including e-money issuance, account issuance, merchant acquisition, domestic money transfer, and cross-border money transfer.
