= Mandai Wildlife Bridge =

Wildlife crossing in Singapore

Coordinates: 01°24′27″N 103°47′00″E

The Mandai Wildlife Bridge is an ecological bridge in Singapore. It links portions of the Central Catchment Nature Reserve that are otherwise separated by the Mandai Lake Road.

The bridge will allow animals, but not people, to cross from one part of the reserve to the other. Prior to the bridge's construction, animals such as mouse deer, civets, shrew-faced squirrels and Sunda pangolins were cut off from others of their own species by Mandai Lake Road. The bridge is intended to allow individuals living on either side of the bridge to breed with each other and increase genetic diversity. According to authorities, roadkill was not the direct reason for constructing the bridge. However, several animals including a Sunda pangolin, a leopard cat, a sambar deer, a wild boar and several Sunda colugos had been found dead on or near the road in the two years prior to the completion of the bridge, and it is hoped that the bridge will reduce such incidents.

== History ==
The bridge spans 140 metres (460 ft) over Mandai Lake Road. The bridge was completed on 6 December 2019 after 2 1/2 years of construction. Trees have been planted on the bridge to replicate a forest environment for animals to use as a crossing although it will take 5 to 10 years for the canopy to mature. The trees planted are of varying heights in order to better replicate a forest environment. The bridge does not actually go into the Central Catchment Nature Reserve but connects two buffer zones which have been established adjacent to the reserve. The buffer zones help ensure that the reserve itself is not impacted by the structure.

The bridge is part of a long-term project to develop the area in an environmentally friendly way. The long-term project will include reforestation of the area, as part of a 10-year Mandai Ecological Reforestation Plan. The project will also add a new bird park and a rainforest park to the area, which already contains the Singapore Zoo, the Night Safari and the River Wonders attractions.
