= Sidewalk shed =

Temporary structure installed over a sidewalk

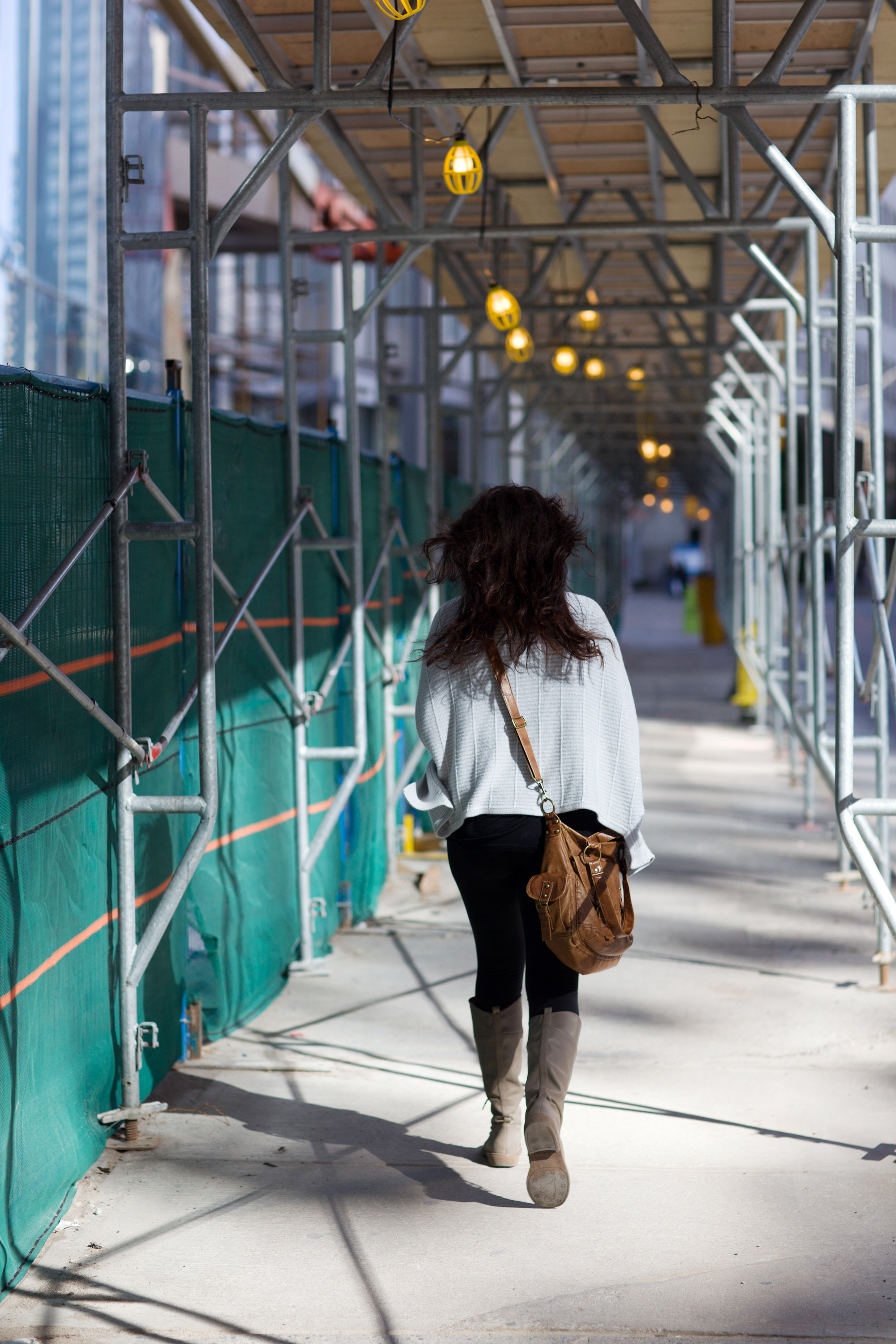
Sidewalk shed in Toronto pictured in 2011

A sidewalk shed is a structure or scaffold installed over a sidewalk. It is used to protect pedestrians from falling debris during the course of construction. The structures are, in general, supposed to be temporary but some become more permanent.

== New York City ==
As of 2023, New York City contained around 400 miles of sidewalk sheds, largely because landlords have discovered it is cheaper to leave the structures in place than fix the issues with the facade of their buildings. The same year, the city began a "Get Sheds Down" plan, which resulted in a reduction of 173 miles of sheds on the city's streets. The following year, it was revealed that the structures were costing businesses between $4,000 and $9,500 in monthly revenue, with restaurants and bars being impacted the most: in the six months following the installation of a sidewalk shed, their weekly transactions decrease by between 3.5 per cent and 9.7 per cent.

As of 2026, 154 Parkside Avenue has had scaffolding on its facade for fourteen years, on an off. Limits on how long the scaffolding can remain in place are being introduced as of 2026, with 90-day limits on scaffolding permits. If no work has been done on the building, the scaffolding must be removed.

The city hired engineering firm Thornton Thomasetti to conduct a review of its facade and safety inspection program (FISP), the first time such a review has been done in forty years.
