= Liang Court =

Defunct Singapore shopping mall

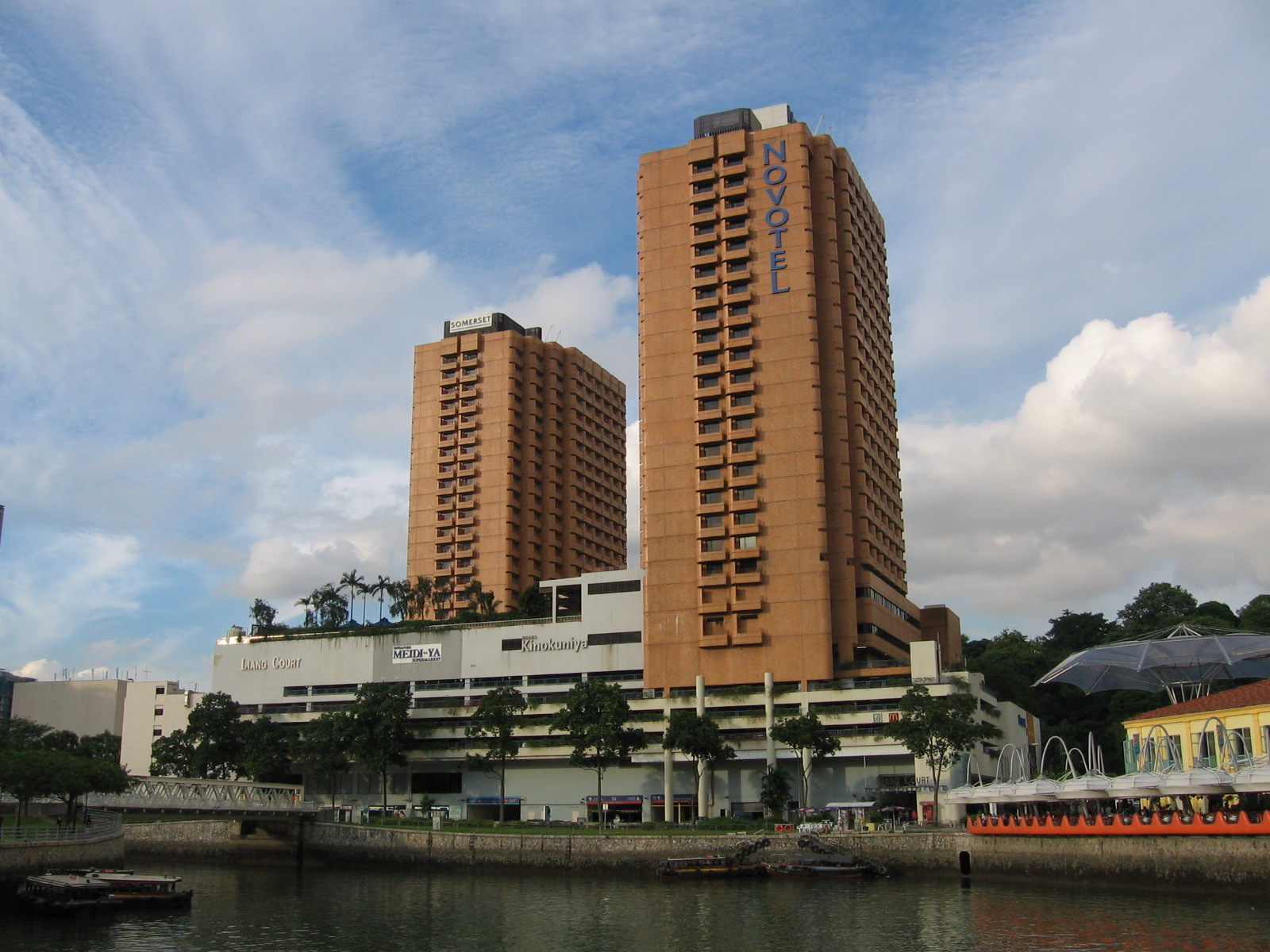
- Liang Court by the Singapore River, February 2006.
- Interactive map of the Liang Court area

General information
- Status: Demolished
- Location: River Valley, Singapore, 177 River Valley Road
- Coordinates: 1°17′30.1″N 103°50′40.8″E
- Opening: 20 January 1984; 42 years ago
- Closed: 1 April 2020; 6 years ago
- Demolished: 2021; 5 years ago
- Owner: CapitaLand and City Developments Limited

Technical details
- Floor count: 7
- Floor area: 254,631 square feet (23,656.0 m^{2})

Design and construction
- Developer: Wuthelam Group Ltd and Daimaru Inc

Other information
- Number of stores: 53
- Number of anchors: 3

Liang Court (Simplified Chinese: 亮阁, Traditional Chinese: 亮閣, Pinyin: Liàng Gé) was a shopping mall located in the vicinity of Clarke Quay, on the Singapore River. It was part of a mixed-use complex that includes the hotel Novotel Clarke Quay (formerly Hotel New Otani) and Somerset Liang Court Residences (formerly Liang Court Regency).

== History ==
Developed by the Wuthelam Group in collaboration with Daimaru Inc, Liang Court opened in January 1984 as the first major shopping mall along River Valley Road. At that time of opening, it had Japanese department store and supermarket chain Daimaru, lifestyle bookstore Kinokuniya, Chinese restaurant Tung Lok Signatures, karaoke chain Party World, consumer electronics chain SAFE Superstore and more than 60 specialty tenants mostly catering to Japanese expatriates. Above Liang Court were two 25-storey tower blocks occupied by Hotel New Otani Singapore and serviced apartment Liang Court Regency, which opened in November 1984. In 2000, Rainforest Cafe opened in the lower floors but was closed in 2002 due to rent in arrears.

In 2003, Daimaru closed down due to declining sales and restructuring. Its supermarket section was taken over by Meidi-Ya and department store section taken over by electronics chain Audio House and smaller shops. Hotel New Otani's management was taken over by Accor Hotels in December 2004, and was subsequently renamed Novotel Singapore Clarke Quay. The mall changed hands twice, having been sold to Pidemco Land in 1999 and subsequently sold to the Asia Retail Management Fund in 2006.

Under ARMF management, the mall underwent major refurbishment works in 2007, coupled with a repositioning of its image. The space once taken up by Daimaru was reconfigured into smaller shops, and Audio House was relocated to Level 4. The basement shops were replaced by Japanese restaurants and shops catering to Japanese expatriates. Refurbishment works were completed in 2010.

Uniqlo opened at the mall's ground floor in November 2013. In August 2016, Audio House closed down its only mall-based store. Following declining business, the mall was sold to a joint venture between CapitaLand and City Developments Limited in March 2019.

Kinokuniya closed its store in April 2019, following the end of its 32-year lease, with various shops and restaurants following suit by the end of that year. All shops were eventually closed in April 2020, along with the hotel and serviced apartments.

== Redevelopment ==
In November 2019, CapitaLand and its subsidiary Ascott REIT, along with City Developments Limited announced that Liang Court will be redeveloped into a mixed-use, integrated development named CanningHill Piers, featuring two residential towers with 700 condo units, a 2-storey retail podium named CanningHill Square, a hotel managed by Marriott International under the Moxy brand and a 192-unit Somerset serviced residence.

CanningHill Square and CanningHill Piers are expected to be completed in phases from 2024, with the Moxy Hotel opening in 2025. An underground link to Fort Canning MRT station will be built as part of this development. As of August 2021, Liang Court has been completely demolished.

== See also ==
- List of shopping malls in Singapore
