= Wong Wee Nam =

Singaporean politician and physician (died 2019)

- Born: 12 November 1947; Colony of Singapore
- Died: 7 September 2019 (aged 71); Singapore
- Education: University of Singapore; University of London
- Occupation: general practitioner
- Employer(s): Wong Clinic and Surgery
- Political party: National Solidarity Party
- Children: 2 daughters

Wong Wee Nam (12 November 1947 – 7 September 2019) was a Singaporean physician and opposition politician who ran against the ruling People's Action Party in the 1997 general election as part of the National Solidarity Party.

== Early life and career ==
Wong graduated from the National University of Singapore (then University of Singapore) in 1972 with a MBBS. Upon graduation, he became a houseman and served his National Service as a Medical Officer. Following a stint in the hospital, he went on to pursue a career at Asia Dispensary and Island Group, before starting his own practice, Wong Clinic and Surgery, and working as a general practitioner until 2016, when he retired. He also worked at the National University of Singapore as a clinical teacher in the Department of Family Medicine. Wong also held a LLB from the University of London.

== 1997 general election ==
Wong contested the Hong Kah Group Representation Constituency (GRC) in the 1997 general election as an opposition candidate under the banner of the National Solidarity Party, along with Steve Chia, Patrick Kee, Tan Chee Kien and Yadzeth Bin Hairis. He and his team garnered 36,920 votes, losing to the incumbent People's Action Party which garnered 82,182 votes.

== Death ==
He died on the 7th of September 2019 from Parkinson's disease at the age of 72.

He was survived by his wife and two daughters.

== Bibliography ==
Wong also authored Thoughts from a Gilded Cage, which was published in 2018 by Word Image Pte Ltd.
