= Killing of Nasiari Sunee =

2019 murder in Singapore

- Date: 18 August 2019; 7 years ago
- Time: 8.30 p.m. (Singapore Standard Time)
- Location: Singapore
- Type: Murder
- Motive: Hate crime and Islamophobia
- Deaths: 1
- Convicted: Andrew Gosling
- Charges: Causing death and grievous hurt by a rash act
- Verdict: Guilty of causing death and grievous hurt by a rash act
- Sentence: Five years and six months imprisonment

The killing of Nasiari Sunee occurred on 18 August 2019, as a result of a racially motivated attack by Andrew Gosling, an Australian, at a condominium in Singapore. The racist attack drew national attention due to the rarity of racially motivated violence in contemporary Singapore, especially when resulting in death.

== Background ==
Nasiari Sunee, 73, was a local Singaporean of Malay ethnicity. He had worked as a delivery driver. He was at the Spottiswoode 18 condominium the evening on 18 August for a housewarming party with his family.

== Incident ==
On the evening of 18 August 2019, the family's housewarming party was located at the patio near the swimming pool of the condominium. During the party, Nasiari's daughter had suddenly heard two loud "thuds", before realising that her father was on the ground and bleeding from his head. Subsequently, the family came cross a glass wine bottle in close proximity of her father. Nasiari's wife had also suffered from minor injures due to the ricochet of the glass wine bottle.

Nasiari was taken to the nearby Singapore General Hospital, but died from his injuries later the morning after, which included a skull fracture. He was buried the day after on 20 August.

== Suspect ==
The suspect, Andrew Gosling, 47, is an Australian that was located at the same condominium. It is not known if he had stayed at the condominium or was there for a visit. He had arrived in Singapore two months prior to the killing in an attempt to look for a job in the country, while being contracted to the Australian multinational mining company Orica.

Shortly after the incident, the Singapore Police Force (SPF) visited every unit at the condominium to look for the person responsible for the act. The wine bottle was labeled "Polissena Il Boro 2016". Gosling was arrested on August 28. He had hid for ten days after the incident, before eventually surrendering himself to the authorities.

He was charged on 30 August for causing death as well as grievous hurt by a rash act under Section 304A of the Penal Code, Chapter 224. His charge was initially amended to a more serious charge of serious voluntarily causing grievous hurt with an instrument (instead of a rash act) on 21 September 2019, but was reduced to the original charge once again during his eventual sentencing.

=== Motive ===
Gosling claimed that the reason he threw the glass wine bottle was that he was "angry and upset" over the 2002 Bali bombings in which many Australians were victims, and had wanted to "startle" the group after identifying them as Muslims as they were Malay.

Gosling had also told the police that he had wanted to use a much stronger weapon such as a gun, but was thwarted by Singapore's strict gun laws that severely restricted him from procuring such weapons. After throwing the glass wine bottle, Gosling hurled "crude, religiously charged vulgarities" about Muslims in the direction of the family.

=== Verdict ===
On 25 February 2022, Gosling pleaded guilty to the charges at the State Courts, specifically for a rash act that killed 73-year-old Nasiari Sunee and causing grievous harm to his 69-year-old wife, Manisah Sitri. On 8 April 2022, Gosling was sentenced to 5 years and 6 months imprisonment, which was backdated to the time of his arrest. Gosling was given four years' imprisonment under the first charge, which was causing death by a rash act, and 18 months for the second charge, which was causing grievous hurt by rash act.

Principal District Judge Victor Yeo Khee Eng stated that "Gosling's acts were religiously aggravated and that the offender had demonstrated religious hostility towards Muslims". In addition, he added that "Such offences could seriously undermine Singapore's racial and religious harmony, and must not be tolerated and must be firmly dealt with."

In the aftermath, Gosling's appeal against his sentence to the High Court was heard, and on 20 December 2022, his jail term was reduced by six months, and he was to serve an amended aggregate term of five years at Changi Prison with effect from the date of his remand (28 August 2019). With the usual one-third remission for good behaviour, Gosling was expected to be released by the end of December 2022 upon the completion of his sentence.

== See also ==
- 2019 in Singapore
- Racism in Australia
