= Payment Services Act 2019 =

Statute of the Parliament of Singapore

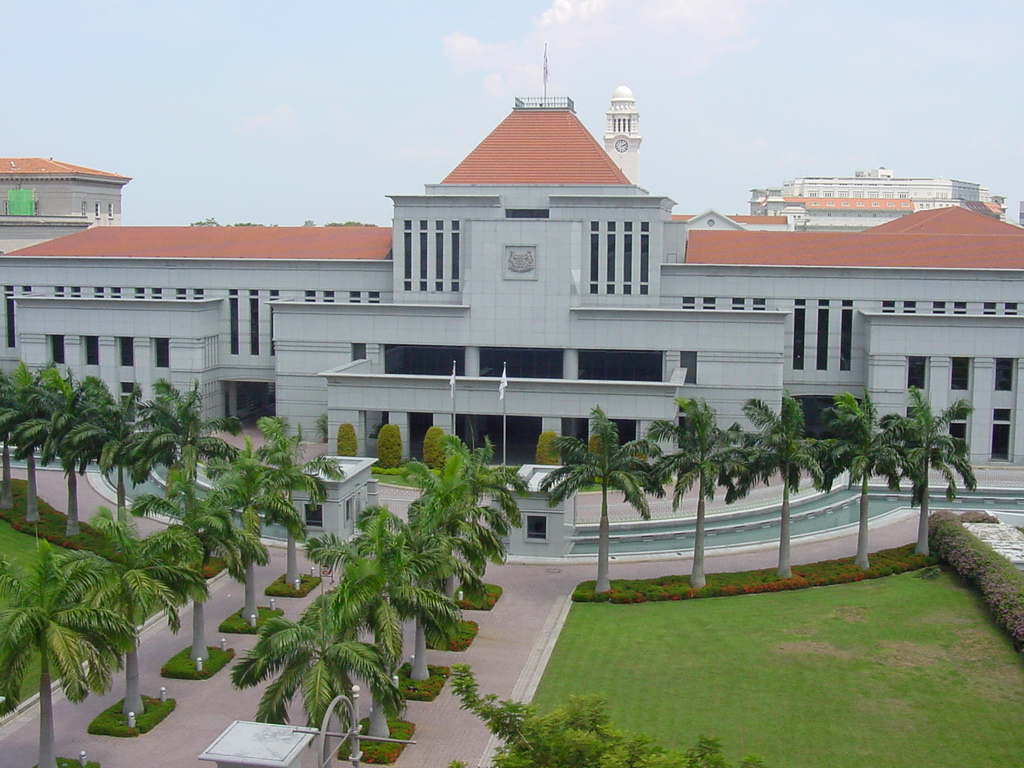

Parliament of Singapore
- Long title: An Act to provide for the licensing and regulation of payment service providers, the oversight of payment systems, and connected matters, to repeal the Money‑changing and Remittance Businesses Act (Chapter 187 of the 2008 Revised Edition) and the Payment Systems (Oversight) Act (Chapter 222A of the 2007 Revised Edition), and to make consequential and related amendments to certain other Acts.
- Citation: Act 2 of 2019
- Enacted by: Parliament of Singapore
- Enacted: 14 January 2019
- Assented to: 11 February 2019
- Commenced: 28 January 2020

Legislative history
- Bill title: Payment Services Bill
- Bill citation: Bill No: 48/2018
- Introduced by: Mr Ong Ye Kung (Minister for Education), on behalf of Tharman Shanmugaratnam (Deputy Prime Minister and Minister-in-charge of the Monetary Authority of Singapore)
- Introduced: 19 November 2018
- First reading: 19 November 2018
- Second reading: 14 January 2019
- Third reading: 14 January 2019

Summary
- The Payment Services (PS) Act is a forward looking and flexible framework for the regulation of payment systems and payment service providers in Singapore. It provides for regulatory certainty and consumer safeguards, while encouraging innovation and growth of payment services and Fintech.
- Status: In force

The Payment Services Act 2019 (PS Act) is a statute of the Parliament of Singapore that provides a framework for the regulation of payment systems and payment service providers in Singapore. According to the Monetary Authority of Singapore (MAS) the PS Act provides for regulatory certainty and consumer safeguards, while encouraging innovation and growth of payment services and FinTech.

The PS Act regulated seven activities: (1) account issuance services, (2) domestic money transfer services, (3) cross-border money transfer services, (4) merchant acquisition, (5) electronic money issuance, (6) digital payment token services and (7) money-changing services. The PS Act does not currently offer licensing for custodial services, although that MAS has published a consultation paper regarding the potential expansion of the PS Act to license custodial wallets.

The PS Act came into effect on 28 January 2020.
