= 2018 in Singapore =

- Decades: 1990s; 2000s; 2010s; 2020s
- See also: Other events of 2018; Timeline of Singaporean history

The following lists events that happened during 2018 in the Republic of Singapore.

== Incumbent government officials ==
- President: Halimah Yacob
- Prime Minister: Lee Hsien Loong

== Events ==
=== January ===
- 1 January – JTC Corporation takes over all of Housing and Development Board's industrial land and properties to support SMEs better, a change first announced on 19 October 2016.
- 4 January – The 4G leaders from People's Action Party release a statement, stating that they will choose a new leader in due course.
- 8 January –
  - Radio station 96.3 Hao FM is launched by Singapore Press Holdings, a Mandarin station that plays classics.
  - The Public Sector (Governance) Act is passed, setting out rules on data-sharing in government agencies, and standardise how statutory boards are run.
  - Changes to the Immigration Act are passed to allow ICA officers to search and arrest suspects at checkpoints first-hand. The amendments have come into force on 1 April.
- 13 January – SG Cares is launched to encourage Singaporeans to help each other, with the SG Cares app unveiled.
- 14 January – Three roads in Bidadari, namely Bidadari Park Drive, Alkaff Crescent and Woodleigh Link, partially open to serve upcoming developments.
- 15 January – The DUO and Marina One projects are officially opened as part of a bilateral partnership.
- 16 January – The agreement on the Johor Bahru–Singapore Rapid Transit System is signed. SMRT and Prasarana are appointed to run the line for an initial 30 years, with subsequent concessions to be awarded through open tenders. The RTS is slated to be ready by 31 December 2024, but has now been delayed.
- 19 January – Northpoint City's new section opened its doors.
- 21 January – Plans for Punggol Digital District are launched. It integrates the future Singapore Institute of Technology (SIT) campus as well as JTC's industrial buildings housing cybersecurity and digital industries with a new heritage trail, to be completed by 2023.
- 25 January - Pasir Ris Central Hawker Centre managed by NTUC Foodfare is officially opened.
- 26 January – Singapore launches its Year of Climate Action.
- 27 January – The Seletar Bus Depot is officially opened during a carnival.
- 29 January –
  - Radio station Money FM 89.3 is launched by Singapore Press Holdings. The station will show programmes about financial matters.
  - The redeveloped Ang Mo Kio Polyclinic opens.

=== February ===
- 1 February – E-cigarettes and shisha are now illegal in Singapore.
- 2 February - NETS services are disrupted for about two hours before being completely restored. This makes it the first service disruption in decades.
- 3 February - The new renovated Yishun Public library at Northpoint City officially reopened after one year revamp in 2017 after the previous library opened since 1998 and 2008.
- 4 February – Heartbeat@Bedok is officially opened.
- 5 February –
  - The Ministry of Transport announced that one-north will be designated Singapore's first drone estate. This will allow companies to research and test new drone technologies, especially with airspace constraints in Singapore. Two days later, the Ministry of Transport, Civil Aviation Authority of Singapore and JTC Corporation announced the first five drone projects to be tested.
  - The Cybersecurity Act is passed in Parliament. The law strengthens protection against cyberattacks. Owners of Critical Information Infrastructure (CIIs) are required to comply with these laws.
- 6 February –
  - The Singapore Exchange (SGX) and Bursa Malaysia announced a stock market trading link, supposed to be operational by end-2018. These plans are put on hold after the 2018 Malaysian general election.
  - A KAI T-50 Golden Eagle, part of the Black Eagles aerobatic team taking part in Singapore Airshow 2018 veered off the runway and caught fire, causing a runway in Changi Airport to close for six hours, disrupting 170 flights. As a result of the accident, the Black Eagles stopped its remaining shows.
- 8 February - SingPass and CorpPass services are disrupted for six hours due to a server fault and not because of any cyberattacks, according to GovTech. Services are fully restored at 5:15 pm that day.
- 9 February - SingPass and CorpPass services are disrupted for the second day in a row for four hours. Though services are restored at 3:15 pm that day, there were still users unable to access both services for Government transactions.
- 12 February – The third mobile virtual network operator (MVNO) Zero1 starts operations.
- 13 February - The Pearl Bank Apartments are sold in an en-bloc sale to CapitaLand for S$728 million. The building will be redeveloped into an 800-unit condominium, now known as One Pearl Bank.
- 17 February - Cheyenne Goh finishes fifth in the 1,500m short track speed skating heat during the 2018 Winter Olympics in Pyeongchang County, making her Singapore's first Winter Olympian.
- 19 February –
  - To better deliver health and social services to seniors, the Community Networks for Seniors (CNS) initiative will be expanded by 2020. In addition, the Ministry of Social and Family Development will transfer its social aged care functions under the Senior Cluster Network to the Ministry of Health, which takes effect on 1 April this year. The Pioneer Generation Office (PGO) will be part of the Agency for Integrated Care too. PGO will be renamed as the Silver Generation Office (SGO), with the ambassadors now known as Silver Generation Ambassadors.
  - The Government announces that the GST will rise from 7% to 9% sometime around 2021 to 2025, as well as the expansion of the GST to digital services from 2020.
- 23 February - During the A Level results, the Singapore Examinations and Assessment Board reveals that part of the H2 Chemistry papers belonging to 238 students from four junior colleges are stolen on 16 November 2017, making it the first time answer scripts from a national examination are stolen.
- 28 February -
  - Gap and Banana Republic closes all stores, after FJ Benjamin decides not to renew both franchises.
  - A new S$10.80 Airport Development Levy (ADL) will be introduced for passengers travelling through Changi Airport, as well as increases to aeronautical charges of S$2.50 from 1 July 2018 to fund expansion projects. The aeronautical charges will increase by S$2.50 per year from 1 April 2019 to 1 April 2024. The landing, parking and aerobridge (LPA) fees for airlines will increase by 1 per cent every year for six years til 2024.

=== March ===
- 2 March – MINDEF unveils unmanned watch towers, first used on Jurong Island.
- 5 March –
  - The Ministry of Education announced that all primary schools will have applied learning programmes by 2023. In addition, polytechnic courses will be cut by 20% over the next two to three years to increase opportunities for students and reduce over-specificity, new Common Entry Programmes for business and IT fields, in addition to engineering, and the expansion of Polytechnic Foundation Programme (PFP). In addition, enrollment at the National University of Singapore will be valid for 20 years in support of lifelong learning.
- 6 March –
  - The Ministry of the Environment and Water Resources announced a new e-waste management system, to be ready by 2021. Producers will be required to collect and treat e-waste responsibly through the extended producer responsibility (EPR) approach.
  - The Ministry of National Development announced new schemes to help HDB buyers. Among them are allowing young couples to show income documents later for housing loans and grants, more flats with shorter waiting time, and removing a three-year time-bar for divorcees to buy flats.
- 7 March –
  - The Ministry of Transport announced an overhaul of the Bukit Panjang LRT line, which will be finished by 2024.
  - The Ministry of Health announced that 6 polyclinics will be built by 2030, on top of 6 announced back in 2012. Among them include the upcoming Nee Soon Central and Tampines North polyclinics by 2023. In addition, MOH also announced a 5% co-payment for new Integrated Shield Plans (IPs) to prevent overconsumption of healthcare insurance.
- 8 March –
  - The Ministry of Culture, Community and Youth announced that the first-ever SG Heritage Plan will be launched. In addition, Hear65 will be launched to promote local music, as well as distribution of SingLit books to schools.
  - The Comprehensive and Progressive Agreement for Trans-Pacific Partnership (CPTPP) is signed as a free trade agreement connecting 11 countries including Singapore. This comes after the United States pulled out of the agreement last year.
- 18 March – Services 800, 804, 805, 807, 811 and 860 are handed over to SBS Transit.
- 19 March –
  - 52 changes to the Criminal Procedure Code and Evidence Act are passed. These changes include video recording of interviews, greater protection for sexual and child abuse, making jumping bail a crime, introducing deferred prosecution agreements, and expanding community-based sentences. In addition, computer-related powers for investigations will be enhanced. A male police or immigration officer will also be allowed to search a woman if there are security risks and a search needs to be done quickly. Several new court procedures are announced, including allowing the court to decide excluding public from proceedings, releasing accused unfit to plead or of unsound mind to help their recovery, expanding video links for trials, admitting psychiatrists in a panel, more control over exhausted court cases to prevent abuse, and improving the victim compensation order.
  - The Cross Border Railways Act is passed to support the development and operations of the future Kuala Lumpur–Singapore high-speed rail and the Johor Bahru–Singapore Rapid Transit System. The law also allows railway assets and train services leeway to negotiate for private financing, something which was not allowed in the first version of the law.
- 20 March –
  - New laws are passed to tackle inconsiderate bicycle parking. Among them are requiring bike-sharing companies to register, a ban from renting bikes after three strikes as well as the use of QR codes for bicycle parking. The laws will also limit parking spaces for developments to support Singapore's car-lite vision. More details of the new licensing scheme are announced by the Land Transport Authority on 4 May, with a three strikes ban for up to a year, and the licensing scheme taking effect from 7 July.
  - The Carbon Pricing Bill, first proposed during the 2017 Budget is passed. It aims to start a carbon tax regime with an initial rate of S$5 per tonne.
- 21 March –
  - The Public Order and Safety (Special Powers) Act (POSSPA) is passed to stop circulation of sensitive information during security operations, with fines and jail terms for breaches. The law came into effect on 16 May.
  - Amendments to the Films Act are passed to give IMDA officers power to enter places without warrants when necessary. The amendments will also include an automatic class licence scheme to protect the young from graphic video games. Shops which sell such games repeatedly could be barred from doing so. Other changes include a new optional co- classification scheme for videos up to a PG13 rating, and new powers for IMDA to reclassify films to a higher or lower rating.
  - The Singapore Premier League is launched.
- 24 March – The redeveloped Kwong Wai Shiu Hospital opened its doors. The new building officially opened on 6 October.
- 25 March – Services 803, 806, 812, 850E, 851 and 852 are handed over to SBS Transit.
- 26 March –
  - Uber announces its withdrawal from Southeast Asia to end a war of attrition with a local rival and has agreed to sell its Southeast Asian operations to Grab. Under the agreement, Grab will acquire all of Uber's operations in a region of 620 million people, including food delivery service UberEats. A few days later, the Competition and Consumer Commission of Singapore (CCCS) (then Competition Commission of Singapore) commences investigations into the merger, about which they are not notified, resulting in fines imposed on both Uber and Grab.
  - Singapore Airlines took delivery of the world's first B787-10.
- 28 March – Construction starts on The Woodleigh Residences and The Woodleigh Mall, a mixed-use development in Bidadari. Being developed by Singapore Press Holdings and Kajima, it will be connected to Singapore's first underground bus interchange and have a Community Club and a Neighbourhood Police Post. The development will be ready by 2022.

=== April ===
- 1 April –
  - Enterprise Singapore is formed as a result of the dissolution of International Enterprise Singapore and SPRING Singapore to help Singapore companies expand internationally. The Competition Commission of Singapore is renamed to Competition and Consumer Commission of Singapore, which is now given authority over consumer protection.
  - The Open Electricity Market by the Energy Market Authority soft launches in Jurong, making it the first area in Singapore to benefit.
- 2 April -
  - A report on 38 Oxley Road is delivered by a ministerial committee, laying out three options for the future of the house.
  - The Changi Museum closes, followed by the Changi Chapel on 1 January 2019 for a revamp as part of a redevelopment programme in more than 15 years, first announced on 29 January. The Museum reopened officially on 19 May 2021.
- 4–15 April - Singapore participated at the 2018 Commonwealth Games in Gold Coast, Australia.
- 7 April - Our SG Heritage Plan is launched, Singapore's first five-year heritage plan along with the first intangible cultural heritage inventory listing 50 items.
- 8 April - Pritam Singh is elected as The Workers' Party's new Secretary-General, succeeding Low Thia Khiang. Amendments to the Party's constitution are also accepted in its first major update since the 1950s.
- 12 April - Mediacorp announced that 8 Days and i-Weekly will go digital with its last issue in September. In addition, Elle Singapore will have its last issue in September, and SmartParents website will be closed down. These moves will allow Mediacorp to focus on its own content.
- 18 April – Construction starts on the new National Skin Centre building and National Healthcare Group's headquarters, which will better serve skin patients, with completion by 2022.
- 25 April – Inuka, a polar bear born in the tropics, dies after declining health.
- 29 April – Full day Sunday trials of the new signalling system on the East West Line begin.
- 30 April – Dave Lee dies after suffering hyperthermia two weeks earlier. It was the second fatality related to military training in less than a year.

=== May ===
- 1 May –
  - Three veteran ministers, Lim Hng Kiang, Lim Swee Say and Yaacob Ibrahim have retired from the Cabinet.
  - The Active Mobility Act comes into force.
- 9 May – The Jurong Region Line is unveiled at the future Canberra MRT station, a fully elevated line running for 24 km (15 miles) with 24 stations. It will be completed in three stages from 2026 to 2028, serving areas like Tengah, Nanyang Technological University (NTU), Boon Lay, Jurong, Jurong Pier, and Pandan Reservoir.
- 12 May – Kampung Admiralty is officially opened. It has eldercare and childcare facilities to facilitate intergenerational bonding.
- 13 May – Kok Yuen Chin dies after a celebration went wrong.
- 18 May –
  - Singapore Airlines announced that SilkAir will merge with Singapore Airlines after an upgrade.
  - The Vulnerable Adults Act is passed to grant the Ministry of Social and Family Development powers to protect vulnerable adults from abuse and neglect, only to be used as a last resort.
- 27 May – The Ministry of Health announces that CareShield Life will replace ElderShield by 2020. CareShield Life will be a compulsory scheme with higher payouts.
- 28 May –
  - The revamped Downtown East in Pasir Ris has reopened its new phase as Market Square, and also have a linkway to D'Resort and another one to E!Hub shopping centre. https://www.ttgasia.com/2018/05/28/singapores-downtown-east-shores-up-s200m-in-upgrades/
  - Full day weekday trials of the new signalling system begin on the East West Line.
- 30 May – Plans for the largest underground substation to be built at the former Pasir Panjang Power Station, which will be completed by 2025, are announced.

=== June ===
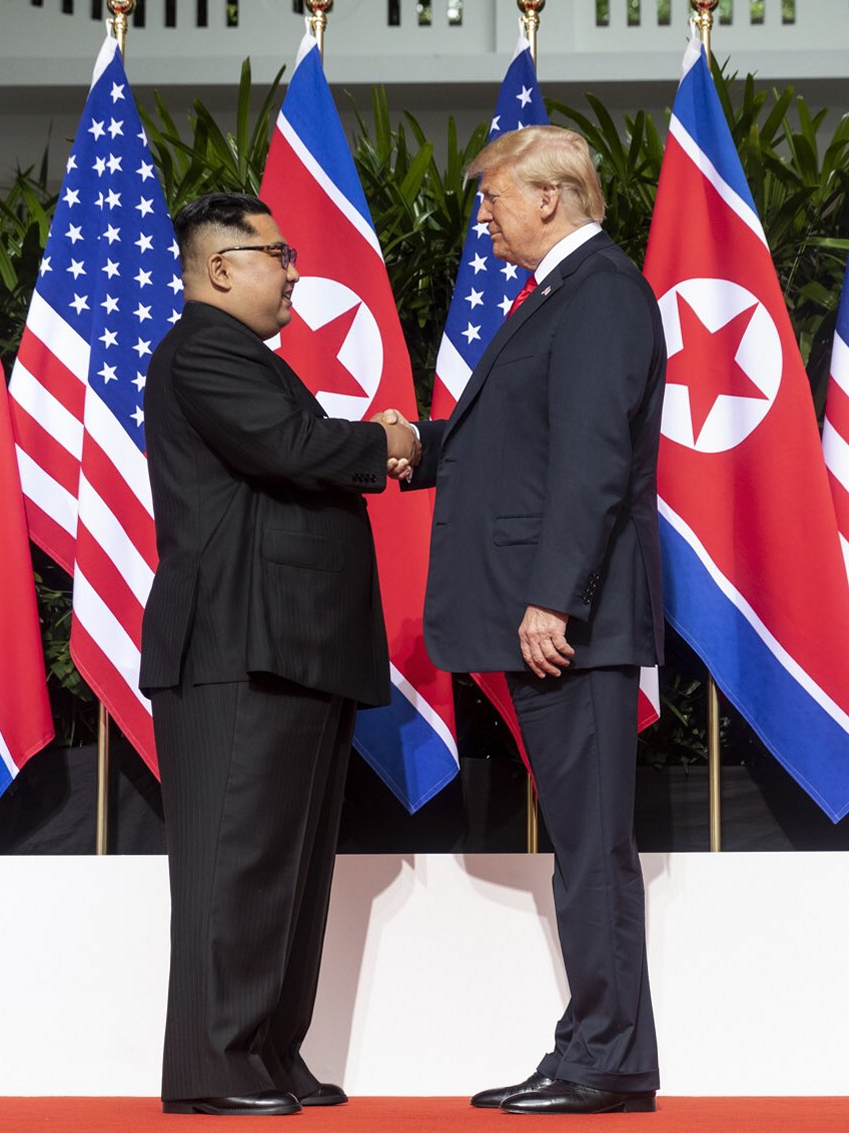
Kim Jong Un and Donald Trump shaking hands at the DPRK–USA Singapore Summit

- 1 June – The CBD is hit by a blackout beginning from 2.40pm, lasting about 34 minutes and affecting 3,156 customers. Investigations reveal that maintenance works are responsible for the outage.
- 6 June – Century Square reopens after a yearlong renovation.
- 12 June – Singapore hosts the first summit meeting between the leaders of the United States and North Korea.
- 13 June – A smoking ban in Orchard Road will be delayed by six months instead of 1 July this year to give shop owners more time to prepare for the change.
- 15 June - Oasis Terraces, the first new generation neighbourhood shopping centre in Punggol is progressively opened before its official opening on 17 February the following year.
- 20 June – Sustenir launches the first locally-grown strawberries, which do not usually grow in tropical countries.
- 21 June – The fourth mobile virtual network operator (MVNO) MyRepublic starts operations.
- 25 June – oBike ceases operations in Singapore.
- 28 June – Singapore's third desalination plant, the Tuas Desalination Plant, opens. It is the first to be operated wholly by PUB.

=== July ===
- 1 July –
  - Construction starts on Bukit Canberra community hub, which will open in 2022.
  - ShareBikeSG ceases operations in Singapore.
- 2 July – The redeveloped Yishun Polyclinic opens.
- 3 July – The Ministry of Education announced that work experience will be taken into account for polytechnic admission, in a move away from academic results.
- 7 July - GBikes ceases operations after new rules for bike-sharing operators come into effect.
- 9 July –
  - The Public Utilities Board and National Environment Agency announce a new complex called Tuas Nexus, which can treat used water and waste, as well as combine water and food waste to produce more biogas. The complex will be fully operational by 2027.
  - The National Library Board will now be allowed to archive digital content under changes passed.
- 19 July – The ITE examinations director, Low Hwee Geok, was found dead at the ITE College Central campus carpark after being allegedly stabbed by her ex-husband. The ex-husband, Seet Cher Hng, was arrested on 20 July and charged with murder the following day. For the charge of murdering Low by inflicting a fatal injury, Seet was sentenced to life imprisonment three years later.
- 20 July – SingHealth data breach: The Ministry of Health and Ministry of Communications and Information announced that personal data of 1.5 million SingHealth patients are illegally accessed and copied in the worst cyberattack to occur in Singapore. Outpatient medication data of 160,000 patients, including those of Prime Minister Lee Hsien Loong who is targeted by hackers, are also compromised. The attack, which took place from 27 June to 4 July, involved data from 1 May 2015 to 4 July 2018 before being finally stopped. The data breach is confirmed on 10 July. As a result of this cyberattack, all Smart Nation projects are temporarily suspended, with mandatory contributions to the National Electronic Health Record (NEHR) put on hold. SingHealth has since imposed an Internet Surfing Separation policy too. A Committee of Inquiry will be formed to investigate the matter.
- 23 July – In the wake of the SingHealth cyberattack, the National Healthcare Group and the National University Health System have implemented an Internet Surfing Separation policy, which now covers all public healthcare institutions.
- 25 July – The Cyber Security Agency of Singapore reports that 70,000 members' data belonging to the Securities Investors Association (Singapore) (SIAS) were stolen in 2013, discovered days after the SingHealth breach was announced.
- 26 July - Plans to form the Singapore Food Agency are announced to consolidate all food-related regulations, taking over from the Agri-Food and Veterinary Authority of Singapore, National Environment Agency and the Health Sciences Authority, with the National Centre for Food Science formed to consolidate all food laboratories. The AVA will be abolished, with non-food plant and animal-related functions to be transferred to the National Parks Board.
- 28 July - Wisteria Mall in Yishun's Southern most area near Khatib MRT station is officially opened.

=== August ===
- 6 August
  - After the SingHealth cyberattack, the Ministry of Health announced that the National Electrical Health Record (NEHR) will be reviewed by an independent group made up of Cyber Security Agency and PricewaterhouseCoopers before asking doctors to submit all records to the NEHR, even though it was not affected by the cyberattack.
  - The Transport Safety Investigation Bureau will now be allowed to investigate all air, sea and land transport-related incidents under a new law passed.
- 9 August - The National Day Parade (NDP) 2018 is held at the Float at Marina Bay for its second time after the NDP two years before was held at Singapore Sports Hub, therefore the following year's parade was held at Padang for Singapore's Bicentennial celebration.
- 18 August – Sengkang General Hospital is opened to the public, with Sengkang Community Hospital opening on 28 August.
- 18 August – 2 September - Singapore participated at the 2018 Asian Games in Jakarta and Palembang, Indonesia.
- 19 August
  - Geylang Serai will be made "culturally distinctive" with more night lighting and activity spaces near the Wisma Geylang Serai (WGS). In addition, the M3 partnership between MUIS, Mendaki and MESRA is unveiled to pool resources for the community. A joint office will be hosted in WGS.
  - Singapore will nominate hawker culture as part of the UNESCO Intangible Cultural Heritage Lists.
  - The Merdeka Generation will get a package that will defray healthcare costs. In addition, the Community Health Assist Scheme will be extended to all Singaporeans with chronic ailments regardless of income, and six more polyclinics will be built by 2023, with potential upgrades to current polyclinics.
  - Holland Piazza, the shopping mall with bar clubs and restaurants is officially opened to shoppers at Holland Village, Singapore.
  - Two new housing schemes, the Voluntary Early Redevelopment Scheme (VERS) and Home Improvement Programme II (HIPII) are announced to enhance the value of older Housing and Development Board (HDB) flats. The Home Improvement Programme will also be expanded to cover HDB flats built until 1997.
- 31 August – The collection of NRIC numbers for draws and making copies of NRIC cards, as well as physically holding the cards will be illegal from 1 September 2019 except when required for security. This will help enhance privacy.

=== September ===
- 1 September –
  - The St James Power Station nightclub holds its last day of operations.
  - The Republic of Singapore Air Force unveils its Airbus A330 MRTT, eventually replacing the Boeing KC-135 Stratotanker.
- 4 September – Speed limits for Personal Mobility Devices and bicycles will be cut on footpaths from 15 km/h to 10 km/h, making it mandatory for cyclists to wear helmets on roads, "stop and look" for vehicles, as well as a maximum speed limit of personal mobility aids. They are among all six recommendations accepted, which take effect from early 2019 after the Panel submitted its recommendations on 24 August.
- 5 September – The Kuala Lumpur–Singapore high-speed rail is deferred until 31 May 2020. Completion is now targeted for 1 January 2031 instead of 31 December 2026 after a new agreement is signed, following initial plans to scrap it. In addition, Malaysia will remit S$15 million in abortive costs to Singapore, which is done on 31 January 2019.
- 8 September – The National Council of Social Service launches a five-year campaign called "Beyond The Label" to fight mental health stigma.
- 10 September – The Land Transport (Enforcement Measures) Act is passed to amend certain laws. Under them, Personal Mobility Devices must be UL2272 certified by January 2021 to provide for fire safety. Registration of e-scooters will also be required too. The new laws will allow LTA to outsource enforcement officers, stiffen penalties for damage to road infrastructure and allow notices to be served electronically.
- 12 September – NETS is appointed to run the e-payments system in hawker centres, canteens and coffee shops in Singapore, eventually supporting 20 payment schemes by 2019.
- 16 September – Coffee chain Costa Coffee closes its last outlet at VivoCity.
- 17 September – The SGQR code system is launched to unify various cashless systems. At the same time, fintech firms and non-bank players will soon be allowed to tap on FAST (an electronics funds transfer service). New guidelines to protect consumers from e-payment fraud and losses are announced, introduced on 28 September.
- 18 September – An island-wide blackout strikes Singapore at 1:29am. SP Group reports that the power outage lasted 38 minutes and affected 146,797 households and businesses. A preliminary investigation reveals that the failure stems from a partial loss of supply from two power generation units.
- 19 September – The Walk2Ride programme is completed, adding 200 km of sheltered walkways.
- 21 September – NTUC Enterprise announced it will acquire Kopitiam, a food court chain. Subsequently, the acquisition is allowed by the Competition and Consumer Commission of Singapore (CCCS) on 20 December 2018.
- 22 September – Singapore Airlines takes delivery of the world's first A350-900ULR, a long-haul plane. This results in the relaunch of non-stop flights to the US, which stopped in 2013.
- 24 September – Creative Technology launches the SXFI Amp dongle, the first product of the Super X-Fi series; which is unveiled on 9 March. It will be supported with an app and uses artificial intelligence to map out ears for optimal sound.
- 28 September –
  - The Stamford Diversion Canal and Stamford Detention Tank are officially opened, helping to relieve the Stamford Canal during heavy rains.
  - The Ministry of Education (MOE) announced the abolishment of exams for P1 and P2 students, as well as mid-year exams for S1 students from 2019. Mid-year exams will also be abolished for P3, P5 and S3 students progressively from 2020 and 2021 with weighted assessments in place. Changes to Edusave awards for P1 and P2 students will be made, recognising positive learning qualities instead of results. Report books will not state class positions and highlight failing scores, along with rounding of scores, among other changes to de-emphasise exam scores. The changes, which fully take effect in 2021, will free up time for learning and allow students to learn without stress.
  - Six bike-sharing companies are awarded licences, with Mobike, ofo and SG Bike granted full licences and Anywheel, GrabCycle and Qiqi Zhixiang granted sandbox licences. Gbikes is unsuccessful in obtaining a licence.
- 29 September – The West Loop of the Punggol LRT line is operational in both directions throughout the day.

=== October ===
- 1 October –
  - Regulations on insolvency are streamlined to lighten the burden on companies.
  - Reflections at Bukit Chandu closes for a revamp, which will enhance and refresh information in the exhibitions and shall reopen in 2021.
- 3 October - YTL PowerSeraya launches Geneco, a consumer and business energy brand in preparation for the open electricity market starting from 1 November.
- 6–13 October - Singapore participated at the 2018 Asian Para Games in Jakarta, Indonesia.
- 6–18 October - Singapore participated at the 2018 Summer Youth Olympics in Buenos Aires, Argentina.
- 7 October – Construction starts on Punggol Town Hub (PTH), to be completed by 2022. It will have a hawker centre, public library, a revamped community club seven times bigger, a childcare centre and multiple healthcare centres.
- 10 October – Measures are announced to enhance safety and security when Changi Airport Terminal 5 starts major construction in 2020, with tunnelling works beginning in 2019. Up to 20,000 workers will be there when construction peaks.
- 15 October – The Stamford Arts Centre reopens after redevelopment works are done.
- 17 October – Future plans are unveiled to develop Sentosa and Pulau Brani, as well as in Orchard Road.
- 18 October – The Health Promotion Board announced multiple unauthorised log-in attempts into HealthHub causing 72 accounts to successfully unlock, resulting in HealthHub access stopping for five days.
- 19 October –
  - The five-year Our SG Arts Plan is launched to boost Singapore's arts scene with eight strategies.
  - Singapore signs a free trade agreement (FTA) with the European Union called the European Union–Singapore Free Trade Agreement.
- 23 October – Dyson plans to build electric cars in Singapore. The first vehicles are targeted to launch by 2021. Dyson announced the following year it will not proceed with the project.
- 25 October – A new app called Dementia Friends is launched to look out for those with dementia.
- 27 October – The Ulu Pandan Bus Depot officially opens during a carnival.
- 28 October –
  - The first phase of Lornie Highway (also known as Bukit Brown Road) opens to traffic, allowing motorists to travel southbound.
  - The Ministry of Education (MOE) forms a taskforce called Uplifting Pupils in Life and Inspiring Families Taskforce (UPLIFT) to tackle inequality by strengthening support for under-performing students from disadvantaged families, led by MOE, Ministry of Social and Family Development and the Early Childhood Development Agency. The recommendations will be out by 2019 with work spanning two years.
- 29 October – Peoples Voice is launched.

=== November ===
- 1 November –
  - The Open Electricity Market by the Energy Market Authority starts its rollout after a soft launch in Jurong on 1 April. This will be done in four phases, finishing with the city area on 1 May 2019, allowing consumers to choose electricity providers.
  - StarHub announced it will stop cable services after 30 June 2019, which after that services will move to fibre networks.
- 2 November – Changi General Hospital's new medical centre is officially opened.
- 3 November – Liu Kai dies after an accident where a Bionix AFV reversed into the Land Rover he was in. It was the third fatality related to military training in less than two years.
- 6 November to 2 December – Four food poisoning cases occur, all involved handling catered food. A total of 444 patrons fell ill, among them are 81 (including one fatality) from Spize restaurant during a Deepavali celebration on 6 November; 190 from a Singapore Civil Defence Force event on 23 November; 131 from a school camp event on 26 November; and 42 from a lunch banquet held in the Mandarin Oriential Hotel on 2 December. It becomes one of the worst food poisoning cases in Singapore since the 2009 Geylang Serai rojak incident. In response, the National Environment Agency suspends the licences of two catering services Spize and TungLok.
- 8 November – The Ministry of Education announced that from 2020, National University of Singapore and Nanyang Technological University will only rely on whole polytechnic GPA scores for admission instead of using part of the O-Level results. Also, the Direct School Admission will be free, with all applications done online.
- 9 November – Sunseap will build Singapore's largest offshore floating solar panel system off Woodlands by 2019.
- 11 November – A new Central Executive Committee for the People's Action Party is elected with Teo Chee Hean and Tharman Shanmugaratnam stepping down.
- 13 November – The 33rd ASEAN Summit is held in Singapore. The leaders of the participating countries will seek to further promote ASEAN integration and community building under the framework of multilateralism cooperation with the theme of "resilience and innovation". The Premier of the People’s Republic of China Li Keqiang also joined this summit.
- 19 November – A new passenger terminal opens at Seletar Airport, replacing the old building.
- 20 November –
  - Changes to the Employment Act are passed to protect all workers by expanding coverage to those who earn more than $4,500.
  - Laws are passed to give Singapore Civil Defence Force (SCDF) officers more powers and legal protection for rescue operations. The laws also criminalise impersonation of SCDF, Immigration and Checkpoints Authority and Singapore Prison Service officers.
- 22 November – Firefly announced it will suspend all flights to Singapore from 1 December. It emerged two days later that the Civil Aviation Authority of Malaysia did not allow Firefly to relocate to Seletar Airport.
- 23 November – Minister for Finance Heng Swee Keat is appointed as the first assistant secretary-general of People's Action Party, with Minister for Trade and Industry Chan Chun Sing appointed second assistant secretary-general. Minister for Health Gan Kim Yong is appointed the party chair.
- 25 November – New link roads in Punggol open to traffic linking Punggol Central to Kallang–Paya Lebar Expressway (KPE) and Tampines Expressway (TPE). The roads come a year early thanks to the use of virtual design and construction (VDC), building information modeling (BIM) and precast concrete.
- 27 November – The Ministry of Social and Family Development launches two guides to help professionals identity child abuse cases, namely the Sector Specific Screening Guide (SSRG) and Child Abuse Reporting Guide (CARG).

=== December ===
- 4 December –
  - Maritime and Aviation disputes: A dispute over airspace in Selatar occurs after the Instrument Landing System (ILS) is installed in Seletar Airport, with Malaysia announcing its intention to take over Johor airspace currently managed by Singapore in stages from 2019 to 2023. At the same time, the Ministry of Transport discloses an ongoing dispute with Malaysia over port limits around Tuas after the latter extended port boundaries on 25 October.
  - The Ministry of Health proposed four measures to reduce sugar in drinks, which are a mandatory nutrition label, making advertising restrictions mandatory with expansions and an ad ban on all channels, a sugar tax and a ban on selling drinks with high sugar.
- 6 December – Maritime and Aviation disputes: The Ministry of Transport extends the Tuas port limits to cover the area extended by Malaysia.
- 7 December – After investigations into mass food poisonings, the National Environment Agency terminates the licence of one of four outlets of Spize restaurant (River Valley outlet) after discovering the food that consumed by 81 patrons contained salmonella, as well as lapses in food hygiene, according to NEA and Agri-Food and Veterinary Authority of Singapore (AVA). A joint statement by MOH, AVA and NEA also reveal that 82 reported cases out of 221 people who consumed the food from seven other incidents linked to the outlet between 6 and 9 November, are prepared on the site.
- 10 December – The Ministry of Health announced that up to eight patients at Tan Tock Seng Hospital are treated with partially sterilised dental equipment, following a case at the National Dental Centre back in 2017.
- 13 December –
  - After operating for 105 years, the Communicable Disease Centre closes.
  - Vivobee launched its MVNO services for migrant workers in partnership with Tata Communications.
- 18 December – The Infrastructure Protection Act comes into force.
- 21 December – Razer Inc. announced its new South-east Asia headquarters in one-north, to be ready by 2020.
- 28 December –
  - The Tiger Sky Tower on Sentosa closes after operating for 15 years.
  - StarHub's Hub Sports Arena ceases transmission as part of the transition to digital TV.
- 30 December -
  - Bangladeshi painter Ahmed Salim murdered his Indonesian lover Nurhidayati Wartono Surata by strangling with his raffia string at the budget hotel in Geylang.

=== Date unknown ===
- Poiz Centre shopping mall at Potong Pasir is officially opened to the public.
- Kinex Mall (previously known as One KM Mall) is opened that features various lifestyle workshops for youths in Paya Lebar

== Deaths ==
- 4 February – Majid Ariff, footballer (b. 1937).
- 4 March – Siva Choy, entertainer (b. 1947).
- 12 March – Ho Poh Fun, poet, writer (b. 1946).
- 14 March – M. Ramlee, actor, singer, presenter (b. 1946).
- 22 March – Morgan Chua, political cartoonist (b. 1949).
- 25 April – Inuka, the first polar bear born in tropics on 26 December 1990.
- 18 May – Nur Alam Shah, former S.League player (b. 1980).
- 3 June – Jek Yeun Thong, former Cabinet Minister and former PAP Member of Parliament for Queenstown Constituency (b. 1930).
- 25 June – Mehrotra Shashi, murder victim of Zin Mar Nwe (b. 1947–1948).
- 7 July – Koh Sok Hiong, former First Lady of Singapore and wife of 5th President Wee Kim Wee (b. 1916).
- 9 July – Syed Abdullah bin Haroon Aljunied, religious leader, businessman and community leader (b. 1930).
- 19 July – Low Hwee Geok, murder victim of the ITE College Central murder (b. 1961).
- 23 July – John Gan Eng Guan, former water polo player and 7th Chairman of Workers' Party (b. 1938).
- 28 July – Kanagaratnam Shanmugaratnam, pathologist, father of Tharman Shanmugaratnam, President of Singapore since 2023 (b. 1921).
- 11 August – Ho Seng Choon, pioneering egg farmer (b. 1923).
- 13 August – Giam Choo Kwee, chess player (b. 1942).
- 23 August – Hsuan Owyang, 7th Chairman of the Housing and Development Board (b. 1928).
- 2 September – Nursabrina Agustiani Abdullah, murder victim of Muhammad Salihin bin Ismail (b. 2014).
- 31 October – Kua Hong Pak, former ComfortDelGro CEO (b. 1944).
- 1 November – Gandhi Ambalam, 4th Chairman of the Singapore Democratic Party (b. 1943).
- 24 November – Tay Boon Too, former PAP Member of Parliament for Paya Lebar Constituency (b. 1933).
- 5 December – Zul Sutan, rock musician (b. 1957).
- 29 December – Lee Kip Lee, former president of the Peranakan Association and father of composer Dick Lee (b. 1922).
- 30 December – Nurhidayati Wartono Surata, murder victim of Ahmed Salim (b. 1984).
