= SME Infocomm Resource Centre =

Not-for-profit organisation

- Small and Medium enterprise Information and Communications Technology Resource Centre
- Abbreviation: SIRC
- Formation: June 16, 2007
- Founder: Lee Boon Yang
- Type: Nonprofit government initiative
- Legal status: Defunct
- Purpose: Help Small and Medium Enterprises in Singapore to advance their use of Information Technology
- Location: 500 Dover Road, Singapore
- Region served: Singapore
- Services: Public workshop programmes
- Website: www.sp.edu.sg/sirc/ at the Wayback Machine (archived 17 September 2008)

SME Infocomm Resource Centre (SIRC) was a Singaporean government sponsored not-for-profit organisation that aimed to help Small and Medium Enterprises (SMEs) in Singapore to advance their use of information and communications technology (ICT).

The vision behind SIRC was for Singapore SMEs to become active users of ICT technologies, and to help them to use the Internet to improve their operations and market their companies at home and abroad. The first SIRC at Singapore Polytechnic was jointly created by Infocomm Development Authority of Singapore and Singapore Polytechnic.

== History ==
It was launched by Minister for Information, Communications and Arts Lee Boon Yang on 16 June 2007.

The SME Infocom Resource Centre was modeled after organizations such as the MCA ICT Resource Centre, APEC Center for Technology Exchange and Training for SMEs and the APEC SME Innovation Centre

SIRC sought to reach out to existing SMEs and new start-up SMEs in Singapore through a series of public workshop programmes. In addition, the SIRC assisted SMEs by providing technical resources to companies embarking on innovative and prototype ICT applications.

Local industries had been encouraged in several minister speeches to take advantage of the services of the SIRC and other government assistance schemes.

== Key programmes ==
The SIRC at the Singapore Polytechnic was involved in several key initiatives under the Infocomm@SME programme by the Infocomm Development Authority of Singapore (IDA). A 2006 IDA survey showed that more could be done to help Singapore ’s SMEs to tap the power of infocomm technology. This programme was not just to equip SMEs with basic ICT know-how but also aimed at helping SMEs to explore the latest ICT technologies and solutions to transform and enhance their businesses.

=== SIRC Workshops ===
The SIRC Workshops were an important means to achieving the mission of the SIRC. The workshops were conducted by industry experts in various fields. The topics of the workshops included:

- Creating business value using Web 2.0
- Infocomm Security
- E-Commerce and E-Payment
- Improving Business Operations through Accounting Software
- Search Engine Marketing

=== SIRC Application Jumpstart ===
IDA’s survey of SMEs found that many local SMEs faced difficulties in starting innovative projects because of the high cost of manpower in Singapore. Many SMEs also faced difficulties in recruiting and keeping talented technical staff. The SIRC helped to bridge the gap by providing technical expertise to help in project implementations. Funding for such projects can come from Singapore government assistance fund SPRING Singapore.

== See also ==
- Interactive & Digital Media Centre
- Ministry of Information, Communications and the Arts (Singapore)
- Government of Singapore
- Economy of Singapore
