= Singapore Standard (regulatory policy) =

Standards used for industrial activities in Singapore

Singapore Standard (SS) specifies the standards used for industrial activities in Singapore. The standardization process is coordinated by Singapore Standards Council, administered by Enterprise Singapore, a Governmental body.

== History ==
The Singapore Standards Council was initially administered by SPRING Singapore. This role was superseded by Enterprise Singapore in 2018 after the merger of SPRING Singapore with International Enterprise Singapore.

== Development ==
As the national standards body, Enterprise Singapore administers the Singapore Standardisation Programme through an industry-led Singapore Standards Council. The Council approves the establishment, review and withdrawal of Singapore Standards and Technical References. It also advises Enterprise Singapore on the policies, strategies, initiatives and procedures for standards development and promotion.

Standards are developed primarily through:

- Adoption of international standards (e.g., ISO 9001 reissued as SS ISO 9001 - Quality management systems – Requirements)
- Development, with inputs from industry, to meet specific needs of the local economy (e.g. SS 631 - Specification for metal roofing system)

Singapore Standards are nationally recognized documents, established by consensus. They are functional or technical requirements in the form of specifications for materials, product system or process, codes of practice, methods of test, terminologies and guides.

Technical References (TR) are transition documents developed to help meet urgent industry demand on a particular product, process or service in an area where reference standards are not available. Unlike Singapore Standards, TRs are not gazetted and are issued without the consensus process. They are prestandards 'tested' over two years before assessment on their suitability for approval as Singapore Standards. TRs can, therefore, become Singapore Standards after two years, continue as Technical References for further comments, or be withdrawn.

== List of Standards ==
The following list is incomplete, and based on the best-selling standards of 2018 by the eShop.

Standard	Name
SS 583:2013	Guidelines on food safety management for food service establishments
SS 638:2018	Code of practice for electrical installations
SS ISO 14001:2015	Environmental management systems – Requirements with guidance for use
SS EN 1997-1:2010 (2018)	Eurocode 7 - Geotechnical design - General rules
SS ISO 9001:2015	Quality management systems – Requirements
SS 551:2009	Code of practice for earthing
SS 532:2016	Code of practice for the storage of flammable liquids
SS 593:2013	Code of practice for pollution control
SS 584:2015	Multi-Tier Cloud Security Standard
SS 554:2016	Code of practice for indoor air quality for air-conditioned buildings
SS 510:2017	Code of practice for safety in welding, cutting and other operations involving the use of heat
SS 553:2016	Code of practice for air-conditioning and mechanical ventilation in buildings
SS 444:2018	Hazard analysis and critical control point (HACCP) system for food industry – Requirements with guidance for use
