= Singapore Standard =

Singapore Standard may refer to:

- Singapore Standard (regulatory policy), the standards used for industrial activities in Singapore
- Singapore Standard Time
- Singapore Tiger Standard, a defunct English language newspaper in Singapore
- Standard Singapore English, see Singapore English
