= IDMC =

IDMC may refer to:

- Internal Displacement Monitoring Centre
- IndyMac (stock symbol)
- Interactive & Digital Media Centre
