= Philip Yeo =

Singaporean businessman

Philip Yeo Liat Kok DUNU
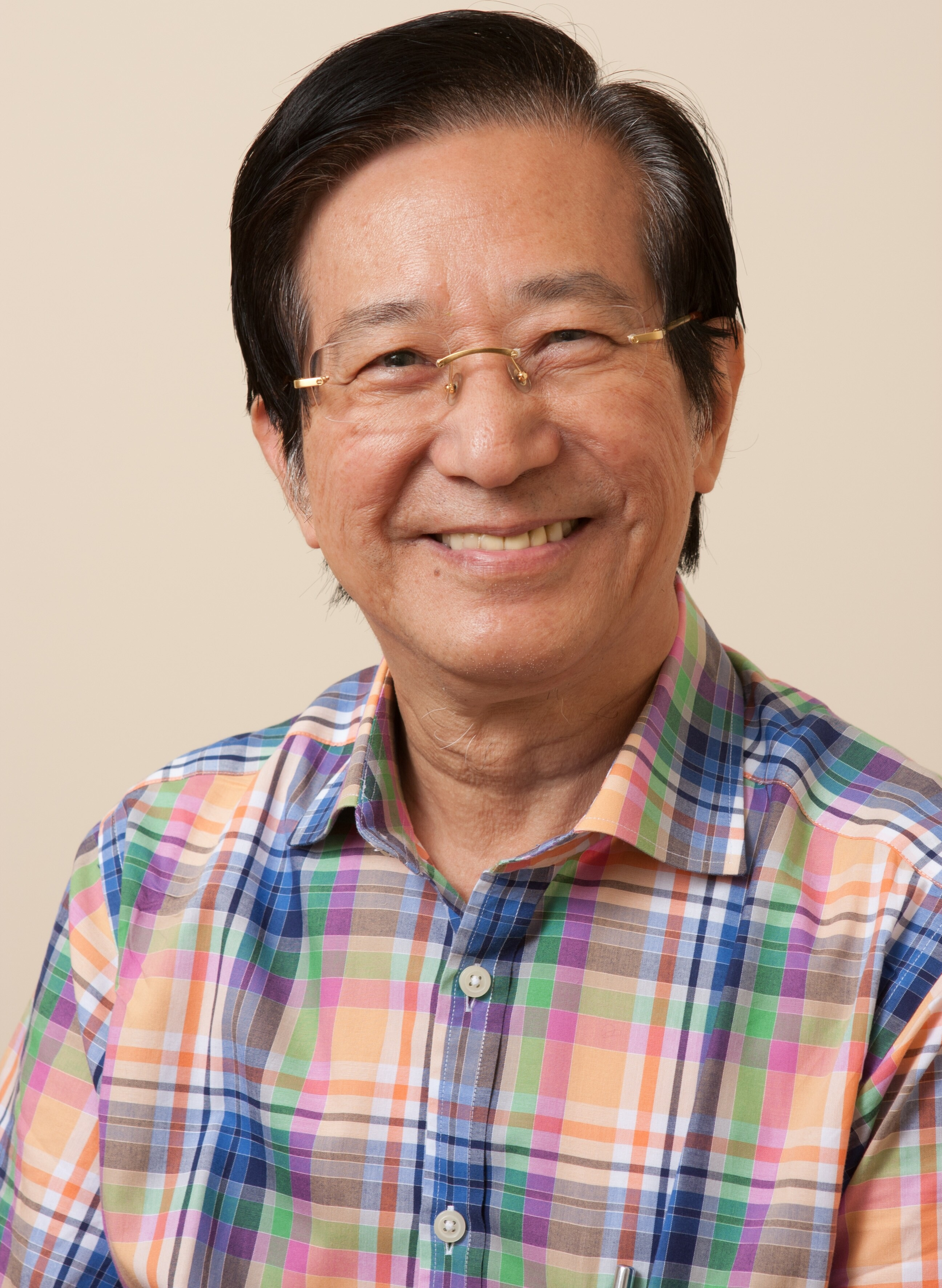
- Occupations: Civil servant Businessman

Noel Philip Yeo Liat Kok DUNU (Chinese: 杨烈国; born 1946), DUNU (First Class), is a Singaporean civil servant and businessman. From April 2007 to March 2018, Yeo was Chairman of Standards Productivity and Innovation for Growth (SPRING Singapore), a government development agency with the mission to grow small and medium enterprises and startups.

== Education ==
Yeo was a student of St. Joseph's Institution in Singapore. He graduated in 1970 in Applied Science (Industrial Engineering) from the University of Toronto under a Colombo Plan scholarship. He obtained a Master of Science (Systems Engineering) from the University of Singapore in 1974. In 1976, he obtained a Master in Business Administration from Harvard University under a Fulbright scholarship.

Yeo has been conferred honorary PhDs from University of Toronto, Karolinska Institutet in Sweden, National University of Singapore, Nanyang Technological University, Monash University, and Imperial College London.

== Career ==
Philip Yeo served in the Singapore Administrative Service from June 1970 to 31 March 1999. He served in various appointments in the Ministry of Defence, including Permanent Secretary for logistics, technology research & development and defence industries. He became acquainted with then Prime Minister Lee Kuan Yew, deputy prime minister Goh Keng Swee and Defence Minister Howe Yoon Chong during his time in service. He left MINDEF to assume the appointment of chairman, Economic Development Board in January 1986.

During his EDB chairmanship, Yeo redirected EDB's focus from the traditional fields to new areas of business. These included: Internationally exportable services; developing high-tech industries like biomedical science, semiconductors, aerospace and speciality chemicals; nurturing local small and medium-sized enterprises and encouraging Singapore companies to make direct investments abroad. Yeo pioneered Singapore's participation in overseas infrastructure development projects such as those in the Bintan Industrial Estate and the Wuxi-Singapore Industrial Park in China.

During this time, Philip Yeo also served as the first Chairman of the National Computer Board (now Infocomm Development Authority of Singapore) from 1980 to 1987. He played a leading role in formulating and championing Singapore's first national computerisation plan to evolve the nation into the information age.

Yeo was the Chairman of A*STAR from 2000 to 2007. As Chairman of A*STAR he was credited with developing Singapore to become a leading centre for biomedical research and development in Asia within fields such as the biological mechanisms of infection, functional genomics, and stem cell research. To that end he recruited, amongst many others, accomplished researchers like Edison Liu, Nancy Jenkins, Neal Copeland, and David P. Lane to work on biomedical research in Singapore's biomedical hub Biopolis.

Yeo stepped down as Chairman of A*STAR and become chairman of the Standards, Productivity and Innovation Board (Spring Singapore) on 1 April 2007. He was also appointed senior adviser on science and technology to the Minister for Trade and Industry.

From January 2009 to January 2010, Yeo was a member of World Health Organization Expert Working Group on R&D Financing.

Mr. Yeo was a member of the United Nations Committee of Experts in Public Administration (CEPA), established by the Economic and Social Council (ECOSOC) from 2010 to 2013 for the promotion and development of public administration and governance among Member States, in connection with the United Nations Development Agenda.

In the private sector Yeo has chaired numerous company boards, including: Singapore Technologies Holdings, Sembawang Corporation, and CapitaLand.Yeo was board member (from 1980) and chairman of the executive committee of Singapore Technologies Holdings from 1987 to 1993.

He also served as Chairman of Sembawang Corporation (1994–1998) and the successor Sembcorp Industries (1998–1999), Pidemco Land (1999–2000) and CapitaLand (2000–2003) formed from Pidemco after a merger in 2000.

Yeo is currently the Chairman of a-iTrust (Ascendas India Trust – Asia's first listed India property trust) and Accuron Technologies. In 2012, he was appointed as one of the first non-Japanese outside directors of Hitachi.

In 2013, Yeo joined the board of directors of the Baiterek National Managing Holding of Kazakhstan, which is a trust management company which manages key Kazakh financial institutions like the Development Bank of Kazakhstan. In December 2013, Yeo joined the Board of Kerry Logistics in Hong Kong.

Yeo also serves as chairman on the board of social enterprise Project Fisher-men, which funds Singaporean social news website Mothership.

== Public service and awards ==
For his public service, Yeo was awarded the Public Administration Medal (Silver) in 1974, the Public Administration Medal (Gold) in 1982 and the Meritorious Service Medal in 1991. In 1987, he was awarded the Eisenhower Exchange Fellowship, USA for the period March to May 1987.

In 1994, the Indonesian Government conferred on Yeo its highest civilian honour, the Bintang Jasa Utama (the First Class Order of Service Award) in recognition of his role in fostering good bilateral ties between Indonesia and Singapore. In 1996, Yeo was conferred the Ordre National du Mérite (National Order of Merit) for his contribution and leadership in enhancing ties between Singapore and France.

In February 1998, Mr. Yeo was honoured by the Belgium Government with the Commander of the Belgium National Order of the Crown for his personal merits in promoting the co-operation between Belgian and Singapore industries.

In the same month, Yeo was awarded the Nikkei Asia Prize for Science and Technology "in honor of his strong leadership in drafting and implementing Singapore's science and technology strategy, particularly in biomedical sciences."

On 9 August 2006, he was awarded the Order of Nila Utama (First Class), one of Singapore's most prestigious National Day Awards.

In December 2007, the Japanese government conferred the Order of the Rising Sun, Gold And Silver Star, which represents the second highest of eight classes associated with the award.

In April 2008, Yeo was awarded the Distinguished Service (Star) award by the National Trade Unions Congress in Singapore. The award is the Singapore Union's highest honour for a non-unionist.

In March 2009, Yeo was awarded BioSpectrum's first Asia Pacific Life Time Achievement Award for the role he played in Singapore's rise as a hub for the life sciences industry and for setting up the Biopolis and Fusionopolis technology complexes.

In May 2013, Yeo was awarded the Lifetime Achievement Award by the Semiconductor Industry Association SEMI. The award was presented to Yeo for his pioneering and significant contributions to Singapore's economic development, especially in the promotion and growth of the semiconductor industry. During his tenure as Chairman of the EDB, Yeo was instrumental in leading Singapore's strategic growth and investment into the semiconductor industry, which today boasts an annual output of over $49 billion, hires over 42,000 employees and has 14 wafer fabrication plants.

In January 2025, Yeo was appointed as the 16th S R Nathan Fellow for the Study of Singapore.

== Scholarships ==
When Yeo joined the EDB in 1986, EDB had a few MNCs who had donated annual scholarships: Sundstrand-EDB Scholarship(1982); Minebea (1985). Some of the key scholarship programs that Yeo set up at EDB include: Seiko Epson (1987–1988), Yokogawa Electric (1988), Shimano (1993), Daicel Chemicals (1994) and Siemens (1995); Mobil (now ExxonMobil) (1997), Singapore Inc (SIS) (1997) and Promising Local Enterprise Scholarship (1996).

In 1989, Sir Paul Girolami, then Chairman of Glaxo, asked Yeo what Glaxo could do to demonstrate its appreciation to Singapore. Yeo immediately suggested a scholarship program. Shortly after that meeting, Glaxo sent S$50 million in two cash cheques to the EDB resulting in the creation of the Glaxo-EDB scholarship program. Since its launch in 1990, the Glaxo-EDB scholarship has trained over 300 BS/MSc scholars.

When Yeo arrived at the Agency for Science, Technology and Research (A*STAR) in 2001, he found that fewer than 20% of PhD holders in A*STAR's institutes were Singaporean, and few among them were young scientists. Yeo immediately set up his boldest scholarship yet by setting up the A*STAR Graduate Academy to implement the plan to train up 1,000 PhD scholars that would eventually return to Singapore and undertake research in fields like information technology, engineering, molecular biology, biochemistry and medicine.

In July 2013, a National University of Singapore scholarship was named after Yeo. The scholarship will send about 10 top student recipients outside Singapore each year for stints at top universities or startup technology companies. Scholarship recipients will get to meet Yeo and also tap his vast network of contacts worldwide. It is hoped that the students will learn some of the following values from Yeo: "never say die, always dare to be different, always want to make a difference."

== Controversy ==
In 1998, as Chairman of EDB, he decided to name publicly the holders of government scholarships who broke their bonds to shame them. This created a controversy generating public debates on whether those who received scholarship have a moral obligation to serve, or whether the scholarship is merely a contractual agreement which could be broken in return for the stated penalties. The debate culminated when MP Chng Hee Kok (庄熙国) questioned Yeo's decision. Yeo responded by calling for Chng to resign his seat in Parliament because of his view. This led to even more unhappiness at the audacity of a civil servant talking down to an elected Member of Parliament. Then Deputy Prime Minister, Lee Hsien Loong had to intervene in what was seen as a face-saving rebuke for both – that Philip Yeo was wrong to tell Chng Hee Kok to resign, but Chng had also been wrong in arguing that it was acceptable for scholars to break their bonds because they were merely legal contracts.

In May 2005, the controversy of A*STAR bond-breakers was revived when The New Paper published an article about him writing in his book that men in Singapore were wimps, whiny, and immature even though they have served the National Service (NS). The reason Yeo gave was that all bond-breakers since early 90s were Singapore men. The anger was further fuelled when a female A*STAR scholar, Chng Zhenzhi, backed his statements and openly declared that Singapore men were fine until "(once) they enter NS, they complain a lot." Philip Yeo served in the part-time NS Special Constabulary (SC) from 1976/78 with the rank of Inspector.

In the same month, Chen Jiahao, a Singaporean PhD candidate at the University of Illinois at Urbana-Champaign was threatened with legal action for accusing A*Star and Philip Yeo of "bribing universities for taking in PhD students" under the moniker AcidFlask on his blog caustic.soda. Chen went on to accuse A*Star of "giving out gobs of honey to universities who will sign back-door agreements for taking in scholars without going through the formal application procedure." Philip Yeo and A*Star responded with threat of legal action, stating that the statements made in AcidFlask's blog would have been understood to mean that A*Star had acted corruptly in its dealings with universities. The statements also cast serious aspersions on A*Star's scholars to the effect that they were not admitted to their universities on merit but only because their universities were bribed by A*Star to do so. A*Star demanded a public apology from Chen and that the offending and defamatory postings in AcidFlask's 3 March 2005 blog be deleted. Chen chose to shut down his entire blog-site. All posts were removed voluntarily, and replaced with an unreserved apology to "A*STAR, its chairman Mr. Philip Yeo, and its executive officers for the distress and embarrassment" caused. The incidents upset several members of the local blogging community for his statements. In February 2007, Yeo, in the comments of another blog, revealed the exact posts that were considered defamatory.

In 2006, Philip Yeo began to face criticism for his Biotech strategy. As billions in taxpayers' money had been spent to develop the Biomedical Industry in Singapore. Philip Yeo countered his critics by pointing out that Biomedical manufacturing output had quadrupled from S$6 billion in 2000 to S$23 billion in the 5 years that the country had been investing in the sector. In that short period, the Biomedical industry grew to account for over 5% of Singapore's GDP and 10,600 high value added jobs. In addition, Yeo also pointed out that during the 5 years of investment, more than 25 companies started research centres in Singapore, including three corporate R&D laboratories run by Eli Lilly and Company, GlaxoSmithKline and Novartis.

In 2006, Lee Wei Ling, head of National Neuroscience Institute, publicly questioned the policy of Philip Yeo and A*Star, asserting that they were wrong by putting public money on competing with western countries on cutting-edge research. She said that Singapore should instead focus on niche areas in Biotech research.

Yeo's work in developing the biomedical industry has received praises by some analysts including Nature correspondent David Cyranoski who wrote that "Singapore's impressive advances in biomedicine are driven by the energetic personality of Philip Yeo."

In response to his daughter's comments, Lee Kuan Yew has stated the following:

"This issue has been deliberated over a period of several months in Cabinet and decided by PM Goh and cabinet. The policy has been continued by PM Lee and his cabinet. We have made significant investments in time and resources. We have to get the most out of what we have put in."

== Private life ==
Yeo is married to Jane and has 2 children, Eugene (Gene) and Elaine. His son, Gene Yeo, received a Lee Kuan Yew Graduate Fellowship that funded his PhD in computational neuroscience at MIT and is now a tenured professor at University of California San Diego. Elaine is a Doctor of Clinical Psychology from Roosevelt University, Chicago.

== See also ==
- Agency for Science, Technology and Research
