= Statutory boards of the Government of Singapore =

Statutory boards of the Government of Singapore are semi-autonomous organisations created and tasked by government to perform a particular, usually operational, set of functions under legislation made by the Parliament of Singapore. Statutes define the purpose, composition, duties and powers of each of these statutory authorities, commissions, public corporations, boards or councils. In other jurisdictions, organisations such as these seen in Singapore might be labeled QUANGOs (quasi-autonomous near- or non-government organisations).

Each of these statutory organisations or boards engages with and reports to a particular government minister through her or his ministry. Singapore is a country known for its highly efficient and centralised government system largely due to these statutory boards. They play a significant role in the development and implementation of policies and programs in various sectors of the country.

Statutory boards in Singapore are responsible for delivering specific essential services or regulating key industries and professions, aiming to ensure independence and continuity. Designed with specialized objectives, this system of statutory boards plays a role in managing public services and administration in Singapore.

The list below includes both current and former statutory boards and authorities formed to date.

== Current statutory boards ==
- Accounting and Corporate Regulatory Authority (ACRA)
- Agency for Science, Technology and Research (A*STAR)
- Building and Construction Authority (BCA)
- Central Provident Fund Board (CPF)
- Civil Aviation Authority of Singapore (CAAS)
- Civil Service College (CSC)
- Communicable Diseases Agency (CDA)
- Competition and Consumer Commission of Singapore (CCCS)
- Council for Estate Agencies (CEA)
- Defence Science and Technology Agency (DSTA)
- Economic Development Board (EDB)
- Energy Market Authority (EMA)
- Enterprise Singapore (EnterpriseSG)
- Gambling Regulatory Authority of Singapore (GRA)
- Government Technology Agency (GovTech)
- Health Promotion Board (HPB)
- Health Sciences Authority (HSA)
- Home Team Science and Technology Agency (HTX)
- Hotels Licensing Board (HLB)
- Housing and Development Board (HDB)
- Infocomm Media Development Authority (IMDA)
- Inland Revenue Authority of Singapore (IRAS)
- Institute of Technical Education (ITE)
- Intellectual Property Office of Singapore (IPOS)
- ISEAS–Yusof Ishak Institute (ISEAS)
- JTC Corporation (JTC)
- Land Surveyors Board (LSB)
- Land Transport Authority (LTA)
- Majlis Ugama Islam Singapura (MUIS)
- Maritime and Port Authority of Singapore (MPA)
- Monetary Authority of Singapore (MAS)
- Nanyang Polytechnic (NYP)
- National Arts Council (NAC)
- National Council of Social Service (NCSS)
- National Environment Agency (NEA)
- National Heritage Board (NHB)
- National Library Board (NLB)
- National Parks Board (NParks)
- Ngee Ann Polytechnic (NP)
- People's Association (PA)
- Professional Engineers Board, Singapore (PEB)
- Public Utilities Board (PUB)
- Public Transport Council (PTC)
- Republic Polytechnic (RP)
- Science Centre Board (SCB)
- Sentosa Development Corporation (SDC)
- Singapore Dental Council (SDC)
- Singapore Examinations and Assessment Board (SEAB)
- Singapore Food Agency (SFA)
- Singapore Labour Foundation (SLF)
- Singapore Land Authority (SLA)
- Singapore Medical Council (SMC)
- Singapore Nursing Board (SNB)
- Singapore Pharmacy Council (SPC)
- Singapore Polytechnic (SP)
- Singapore Tourism Board (STB)
- Sport Singapore (SPORTSG)
- TCM Practitioners Board (TCMPB)
- Temasek Polytechnic (TP)
- Tote Board (TOTE BOARD)
- Urban Redevelopment Authority (URA)
- Skills and Workforce Development Agency (SWDA)
- Yellow Ribbon Singapore (YRSG)

== Former statutory boards ==
- Agri-Food and Veterinary Authority of Singapore (AVA), formed on 1 April 2000 to regulate food and veterinary issues. Dissolved into Singapore Food Agency (SFA) for food issues and National Parks Board (NParks) for veterinary issues on 1 April 2019
- Casino Regulatory Authority of Singapore (CRA), reconstituted to become Gambling Regulatory Authority of Singapore (GRA) on 1 August 2022.
- Commercial and Industrial Security Corporation (CISCO), corporatised as CISCO Security on 5 July 2005.
- Competition Commission of Singapore (CCS), formed on 1 January 2005 to enforce competition law. Renamed to Competition and Consumer Commission of Singapore (CCCS) on 1 April 2018 to reflect its new role in protecting consumer rights
- Nanyang Technological University (NTU), corporatised on 1 April 2006
- National University of Singapore (NUS), corporatised on 1 April 2006
- Post Office Savings Bank (POSB), acquired by DBS Bank on 16 November 1998.
- Singapore Broadcasting Authority (SBA), formed on 1 October 1994, merged into Media Development Authority on 1 January 2003.
- Singapore Broadcasting Corporation (SBC) corporatised as the Television Corporation of Singapore on 1 October 1994
- Singapore Corporation of Rehabilitative Enterprises (SCORE), formed on 1 April 1976 to assist ex-offenders, renamed to Yellow Ribbon Singapore on 1 May 2020.
- Singapore Harbour Board, taken over by the Port of Singapore Authority on 1 April 1964
- SingTel corporatised on 1 April 1992
- SingPost corporatised on 1 April 1992
- National Computer Board, reorganised into Infocomm Development Authority of Singapore on 1 December 1999.
- Telecommunication Authority of Singapore, reorganised into Infocomm Development Authority of Singapore on 1 December 1999.
- Public Works Department, corporatised as the CPG Corporation in 1999
- Media Development Authority (MDA) and Infocomm Development Authority of Singapore (IDA), reorganised into Infocomm Media Development Authority (IMDA) in 2016
- Singapore Totalisator Board, rebranded as Tote Board (TOTE BOARD) in 2008
- Preservation of Monuments Board (PMB), merged as Preservation of Sites and Monuments under National Heritage Board (NHB) on 1 July 2009
- Singapore Sports Council (SSC), rebranded as Sport Singapore (SPORTSG) on 1 April 2014
- Singapore Workforce Development Agency (WDA), reconstituted as Workforce Singapore (WSG) on 4 October 2016
- SkillsFuture Singapore (SSG)
- Council for Private Education (CPE), functions absorbed under a new statboard SkillsFuture Singapore (SSG) on 4 October 2016
- SPRING Singapore (SPRING), formed in 2002 to support enterprises, reorganised into Enterprise Singapore (ESG) on 1 April 2018
- Trade Development Board, formed in 1983 and renamed to International Enterprise Singapore (IE Singapore) in 2002 to support internationalisation, reorganised into Enterprise Singapore (ESG) on 1 April 2018
- Workforce Singapore (WSG), reconstituted as Skills and Workforce Development Agency (SWDA) on 1 July 2026

== Statutory or privatised government corporations ==
- Civil Aviation Authority of Singapore, reconstituted with regulatory functions on 1 July 2009
  - Changi Airport Group, corporatisation of airport operations on 1 July 2009
- Housing and Development Board
  - Building & Development Division, corporatised into HDB Corporation on 1 July 2003, renamed to Surbana Corporation and now CapitaLand Township.
- Jurong Town Corporation, corporatised and reconstituted as JTC Corporation on 15 November 2000
  - Ascendas Private Limited, corporatisation and merger of property group on 8 January 2001
  - Jurong Consultants Private Limited, corporatisation of technical services group on 9 April 2001
  - Jurong Port Private Limited, corporatisation of port services group on 12 January 2001
- Port of Singapore Authority (PSA)'s regulatory functions transferred to the Maritime and Port Authority of Singapore on 2 February 1996
  - PSA International, corporatisation of port services on 1 October 1997
- Singapore Power, corporatisation of electricity and gas services on 1 October 1995

== See also ==
- Singapore Civil Service
- Public Service Commission
- Organisation of the Government of Singapore
