= Sujay Solomon Sutherson =

Indian-born Singaporean convicted of killing his mother in 2012

- 2012 police mugshot of Sujay Solomon Sutherson
- Born: c. 1981; India
- Died: 8 September 2022 (aged 41); Changi General Hospital, Singapore
- Parent(s): Mallika Jesudasan (mother); Unnamed father
- Status: Died during incarceration in 2022
- Conviction: Manslaughter (one count)
- Criminal charge: 1st charge: Murder of Mallika Jesudasan
- Penalty: Life imprisonment

Sujay Solomon Sutherson (c. 1981 – 8 September 2022) was a Singaporean prisoner who was convicted of the manslaughter of his mother Mallika Jesudasan in 2012. Sujay, who was born in India but emigrated in Singapore at age 15, was charged with murdering his mother, after he was arrested for using three knives to slit his mother's throat before attempting to decapitate her, and disposed of her body in a suitcase. Sujay was found to be suffering from paranoid schizophrenia and it severely impaired his mental responsibility at the time of the murder, which allowed Sujay's murder charge to be reduced to manslaughter on the grounds of diminished responsibility. After a five-day trial in 2015, Sujay was found guilty of manslaughter and sentenced to life imprisonment.

On 8 September 2022, seven years after he was sentenced, Sujay died at the age of 41 due to septicemia while serving his sentence at Changi Prison.

== Early life ==
=== Childhood and emigration to Singapore ===
Sujay Solomon Sutherson, the eldest of three children, was born in India in 1981. His father was an affluent businessman based in Chennai, Tamil Nadu, while his mother Mallika Jesudasan was an ethnic Indian-Singaporean who hailed from Singapore; his parents married through the arrangement of Sujay's maternal grandparents in 1979, and his mother settled in India with her husband. Mallika's mother died in 1981 while Mallika's father, who remarried to a divorcee with three children, died in 2001.

By the mid-1990s, the business of Sujay's father floundered, and due to this, Sujay's mother Mallika decided to move back to Singapore for better job prospects, and for the sake of providing her children better education, Sujay and his two younger siblings (a brother and sister) were brought back to Singapore by their mother; Sujay was 14 or 15 years old at the time when he first set foot into his mother's birth country, and he obtained Singapore citizenship sometime after emigrating there. Sujay, his siblings and mother were taken in by Mallika's younger sister Leela, and in addition to a domestic helper and Leela's elder son, the seven of them lived together in a four-room flat in Bukit Batok, and Mallika became a church secretary. Sujay's parents divorced barely two years after Mallika and their children moved back to Singapore. At the time of her death in 2012, Mallika worked as a public relations coordinator.

Sujay, who was eloquent and had a love for cricket, reportedly struggled in his late teens, but he eventually completed his university studies and graduated with an arts degree from the National University of Singapore (NUS).

=== Psychiatric problems ===
According to his family, Sujay's behaviour began to change in 2005, and eventually, at age 26, Sujay was diagnosed with paranoid schizophrenia, and although his family tried their best to help him and take care of him, it was reportedly a challenge as Sujay did not adhere to his medication and did not accept that he was mentally ill.

Based on hospital records, in May 2006, Sujay was first hospitalized at the Institute of Mental Health (IMH) for 11 days after he was arrested for waving knives at his uncle, and was prescribed with antipsychotic medication. Initially, after his discharge, Sujay regularly attended his follow-up sessions, but he began to default on them in October 2006. Sujay was once again taken by his family members to the IMH in June 2007, after they reported that he had behaved in a hostile manner towards them, and he was hospitalized for about a month. Sujay went for follow-up check-ups in the next three years and six months, but he once again skipped his treatment thereafter. In February 2011, Sujay's mother and uncle observed that he had a relapse, but Sujay refused to accept treatment or even antipsychotic injections. In the following months, Sujay's family found that Sujay's condition had deteriorated and that they suspected that he had not been taking his medication regularly.

== Murder of Mallika Jesudasan ==
=== Fatal stabbing ===
On 27 May 2012, at their flat in Bukit Batok, 31-year-old Sujay Solomon Sutherson murdered his 56-year-old mother Mallika Jesudasan.

Sheena (aged 31 in 2015), Sujay's sister, last seen her mother alive at 6.30pm when she left the flat to meet a friend, and at that point of time, Mallika was left alone at home with her elder son Sujay. According to Sujay, Mallika asked him for money after they had their dinner on that fateful day, but he turned down her request and proceeded to the kitchen to wash his plate. Sujay said that when he did so, Mallika grabbed his hair and scratched him, and allegedly, Mallika tried to undress her son, wanting to get intimate with him, and this caused Sujay to react by picking up a knife with a blue handle from the kitchen counter and plunged the knife into Mallika's neck. Afterwards, with the knife still embedded in her neck, Mallika staggered back towards her bedroom and tried to reach for the phone. Sujay, who took a second knife from the kitchen and caught up with Mallika, and stabbed his mother in her throat in order to stop her from using the phone. The second stabbing causing her to collapse, but despite being mortally wounded, Mallika writhed on the floor for some time and spoke unintelligibly. Seeing this, Sujay once again headed to the kitchen to retrieve a silver butterfly knife and in Sujay's own words, he did not want to get "attacked again", and so he used the third knife to slit his mother's throat. As a result of her wounds, 56-year-old Mallika Jesudasan died on the spot.

=== Concealment of body and arrest ===
After staring at her body for a period of time, Sujay decided to dispose of the body. He first wrapped Mallika in bedsheets and blankets, covered her with some old newspapers and poured alcohol from a vodka bottle and a bottle of rice wine, and used a stove lighter to set fire to his mother's corpse. However, it failed as the fire only could burn parts of Mallika's clothing before it died out. Undeterred by his failure, Sujay wrapped the body up in more bedsheets and blankets before he dragged the body from his mother's bedroom to his own bedroom. He finally hid the body under his bed after he re-arranged some of the items beneath the bed. Sujay mopped the floor in order to clear away the bloodstains from the flat. While he was in the midst of cleaning, his younger brother Sunil returned home and found the door locked from the inside. Although Sujay pacified his brother by stating that he would open the door once he finished cleaning the house, Sunil found it strange as Sujay never did any house-cleaning. After a few minutes, Sujay allowed his brother into the flat, and it was then dawned upon Sunil that his mother was missing, without knowing that his brother had killed their mother hours earlier.

After failing to reach his mother by phone, Sunil contacted his sister and uncle and sought their help to look for Mallika, and according to Sujay's uncle, when he reached the flat, he noticed that his sister's bedroom floor was wet, and he also saw pieces of burnt fabric and paper in the kitchen. Despite his suspicions, Sujay's uncle and his sister's two younger children walked around the neighbourhood to search for Mallika, they were still unable to locate Mallika. Upon returning to the flat, Sujay's uncle detected a strong detergent-like odour coming from one of the rags found in the toilet. He also noticed blood on the hand of his elder nephew, who lied to his uncle that he last saw his mother at the void deck after he passed her the food he bought from downstairs. Subsequently, Sujay's uncle and brother both went into Sujay's bedroom (which he shared with his brother), and they noticed a suitcase from underneath Sujay's bed. Sujay arrived to stop his uncle, but it was too late as the uncle discovered a pair of Mallika's legs sticking from under the bed.

After making the grisly discovery, Sujay's uncle immediately put two and two together and confronted Sujay, and told Sujay's siblings to call the police. However, Sujay turned violent and demanded that his uncle and siblings hand over their phones. Sujay's uncle got into a scuffle with Sujay while Sujay's siblings managed to slip away; Sheena hid in her bedroom and called the police while Sunil rushed to a nearby police station to seek help. A team of officers, led by Senior Staff Sergeant Mohamed Jasmani Bin Mohamed Hassan, arrived at the flat soon after the siblings lodged a police report. It was at that point, Sujay finally confessed that he actually murdered his mother over an argument, and for this, Sujay was arrested on suspicion of murdering his mother after another team of policemen, led by Senior Station Inspector Riduan Bin Hamid, arrived to apprehend Sujay for the crime. Many neighbours were shocked to hear about the murder, with one of them stating that Mallika was a "warm and friendly woman" who greeted them and would give them cookies during Chinese New Year.

== Murder charge ==
On 29 May 2012, 31-year-old Sujay Solomon Sutherson was charged with the murder of his mother Mallika Jesudasan in a district court. Under Singaporean law, Sujay would be sentenced to death by hanging if he was found guilty of murder. On 5 June 2012, a week after he was first charged, Sujay was remanded for his pre-trial psychiatric evaluation.

On 2 October 2013, the charge of murder against Sujay was reduced to culpable homicide not amounting to murder (equivalent to manslaughter in Singapore's legal context), a lesser offence that warranted either life imprisonment or up to 20 years' jail with a possible fine or caning. The reduction of the murder charge allowed Sujay to escape the death penalty for murdering his mother, although the prosecution requested for additional psychiatric tests to determine if he was of sound mind at the time of the killing.

== Trial and appeal ==
=== Trial hearing ===
On 6 July 2015, three years after he killed his mother, 34-year-old Sujay Solomon Sutherson stood trial at the High Court for the manslaughter of his 56-year-old mother Mallika Jesudasan. The trial was presided over by Judicial Commissioner Hoo Sheau Peng (aged 45 in 2015), who was reportedly the first female judge of the High Court to preside over criminal cases in the High Court. Sujay was not represented by a lawyer during his trial, while the prosecution was led by Deputy Public Prosecutor (DPP) Kumaresan Gohulabalan.

During the trial itself, Dr Kenneth Koh, a government psychiatrist, presented his psychiatric report to the court. Dr Koh's report revealed that Sujay had suffered a relapse of his paranoid schizophrenia during the brutal attack, and having referred to Sujay's medical history, he found that the condition had severely deteriorated over the next few years since Sujay's first diagnosis in 2006, due to Sujay refusing to accept treatment, and Dr Koh also assessed that the condition had severely impaired his mental responsibility at the time of the murder, and Sujay, who appeared capable of concealing his symptoms in everyday life, was a "dangerous individual" who posed a risk to himself and others should he continue to not follow up on his treatment and medication. Sujay's younger brother Sunil (aged 28 in 2015) stated that he witnessed his brother throwing away his medication, flushing his pills down the toilet and throwing them into the rubbish chute. Dr George Paul, a forensic pathologist, testified that based on his autopsy findings, Mallika died from multiple stab wounds to the neck and either one of the injuries inflicted by Sujay on his mother would have been sufficient in the ordinary course of nature to cause death.

Sujay elected to give his defence when it was called. Sujay testified that on the date of the murder, his mother had started it all and hence he killed her. He testified that he was forced to kill her in self-defence due to Mallika scratching his face during the quarrel and wanted to undress him, and even disputed portions of his police statement. However, the prosecution refuted Sujay's claims, stating that his testimony was ought to be rejected, given that there was no right to Sujay's claim of private defence against Mallika's alleged acts, and even if these acts really took place, it "did not cause the accused (Sujay) to reasonably apprehend death or grievous hurt", and Sujay could have simply chose to report the matter to the police rather than resorting to drastic violence. DPP Kumaresan also pointed out that Sujay had taken meticulous steps to conceal the body and clean up the home to hide the evidence, and even lied to his family members about the deceased's whereabouts, and they also brought the court's attention to the relapse which Sujay suffered at the time of the homicide.

=== Conviction and life sentence ===
On 11 August 2015, after a trial lasting five days, Judicial Commissioner Hoo Sheau Peng delivered her verdict. She found 34-year-old Sujay Solomon Sutherson guilty of the manslaughter charge, after she rejected Sujay's claims of having killed his mother in self-defence. She pointed out that even if Sujay's account was accepted, Sujay had no right to self-defence, and it was only entitled to those who faced with assault that is likely to cause death or grievous hurt. Judicial Commissioner Hoo also said that after stabbing his mother the first time, Sujay would have expected that his mother would die from the injury and would not have reasonably expected her to pose as a danger to him, and hence the second stabbing that happened afterwards could only point to the fact that Sujay had "deliberately" attacked and killed his mother in a sinister manner. A sentencing hearing was scheduled to take place in September 2015, the following month after Sujay's conviction.

In their final submissions, the prosecution sought the maximum sentence of life imprisonment, arguing that the case had "shocked the conscience" due to the cruelty and violence, and Sujay was a danger to society as he was "unpredictable, lacked insight into his mental illness", and was able to disguise his symptoms due to his above-average intelligence. The brutal and grisly manner of the killing and the meticulous steps which Sujay took to conceal his mother's death, as well as Sujay's "callous disregard for human life" were among the aggravating factors highlighted by the prosecution in favour of a life sentence, and they cited that placing Sujay in a controlled environment would be essential to make sure he was given consistent treatment for his condition. In response, Sujay make his own arguments, repeating the defence he raised in court and also pointed out that the precedent cases cited by the prosecution for sentencing had a "level of premeditation that was not present" in his case.

On 15 September 2015, Judicial Commissioner Hoo issued her decision, sentencing 34-year-old Sujay Solomon Sutherson to life in prison. Judicial Commissioner Hoo found that the conduct of Sujay and nature of his offence was "grave enough to require a long sentence", and based on Sujay's "unstable character", his refusal to acknowledge his mental condition, and history of paranoid schizophrenia, the judge ruled that Sujay should be jailed for life for the protection of the public. In view of Sujay's psychiatric condition, Judicial Commissioner Hoo decided to not impose caning for Sujay.

=== Dismissal of appeal ===
On 28 November 2016, Sujay appealed to the Court of Appeal against his life sentence. Without a lawyer, Sujay made his own arguments before the appellate court's three-judge panel – Chief Justice and two Judges of Appeal Chao Hick Tin and Tay Yong Kwang – and asked that his sentence should be overturned. Not only did Sujay once again brought up the previous arguments of self-defence (which were raised during his trial), Sujay additionally accused his mother for having stabbed him in the head with a knife, and stated that it caused him to kill his mother.

The prosecution refuted this new claim, stating that it was their first time hearing Sujay making this statement, and the judges concurred by pointing out that a medical examination found no injuries on Sujay at the time of his arrest, which disputed his claim of being stabbed by his mother, and hence they rejected this new claim, in addition to Sujay's trial defence. The Court of Appeal also ordered that Sujay's psychiatric condition should be monitored during his time of imprisonment, and agreed that a lengthy jail term was warranted to keep him institutionalized to ensure Sujay's compliance with his regime. Chief Justice Menon, in dismissing the appeal, described that the offence was "brutal in nature with disastrous consequences" and added that there was a "sufficient likelihood of recurrence" due to Sujay's psychiatric condition and hence, the appellate court confirmed both the manslaughter conviction and life sentence in Sujay's case.

== Imprisonment and death ==
=== Prison life and medical issues ===
After his sentencing, Sujay Solomon Sutherson was incarcerated at Changi Prison, where he was serving his life term, which was backdated to the date of his remand on 29 May 2012. Sujay was provided with medical care due to his psychiatric condition during his period of incarceration. Over the next seven years, Sujay would face another set of health problems, mainly vitamin B12 deficiency, and sensory ataxia – a loss of body coordination due to a nerve impairment. Despite the weakness in his limbs, a prison officer noted that Sujay generally did not require physical assistance and had been independent, although he sometimes used a walking frame or wheelchair to move around.

In August 2022, the tenth year of his imprisonment, Sujay experienced a fall due to his weak limbs. Over the next two weeks, Sujay would have two more falls, and on 5 September 2022, he was referred to a doctor for his weakness of limbs; he told the doctor that he would feel dizzy before each fall and he also vomited three times that day, had speech difficulties, and found it hard to swallow. The prison doctor diagnosed Sujay with low blood pressure, and he found that not only did Sujay had weakness in his limbs, his face appeared to be deformed on the right side and he was dehydrated, and his speech was also slurred while his mouth was dry. Sujay was subsequently taken to Changi General Hospital (CGH) and admitted to the intensive care unit, where the doctors diagnosed him with septic shock, which was caused by an infection as a result of Sujay's low blood pressure, and his blood pressure level was dangerously low.

=== Death and coroner's inquiry ===
On 6 September 2022, merely a day after Sujay was admitted to Changi General Hospital, the prison authorities were notified by the hospital staff that Sujay was critically ill. Despite the treatment for septic shock, Sujay's condition did not improve, and he was gravely ill to the extent that the doctors found it unsuitable for them to investigate the source of the sepsis. Sujay eventually died from multiple organ failure as induced by septicaemia (blood poisoning) on 8 September 2022. At the time of his death, Sujay Solomon Sutherson was 41 years old and he had served ten years, three months and ten days behind bars.

On 30 March 2023, a coroner's inquiry was held to hear the case of Sujay's death and issued its verdict. State Coroner Adam Nakhoda ruled out the possibility of foul play in his judgement of Sujay's death, and concluded that Sujay died of natural causes while serving his life sentence. It was also reported that Sujay's uncle, who regularly visited his nephew once every three weeks, did not raise any issues regarding the medical attention Sujay underwent while in jail or his living conditions at Changi Prison, and Sujay's surviving kin did not raise any issues with regards to his hospitalization.

== Aftermath ==
In the aftermath of Sujay's sentencing, Sujay's uncle Daniel Jesudasan agreed to speak to the media about his nephew. He stated that in spite of the horrific end his sister met, he still loved his nephew and described him as a "well-behaved child of above-average intelligence" who was thoughtful and considerate, and he revealed that despite the knowledge of his condition, the whole family was shocked over the violence that Sujay exhibited in the killing of his mother. Sujay's uncle, who was the only family member to be present in the courtroom during his nephew's sentencing trial, continued to visit him in prison up until Sujay's death in 2022. In the three years since the incident, Sujay's siblings have also renovated the flat and continued to live there; the both of them were unable to attend the sentencing hearing of their brother due to one of them having work commitments while the other was overseas.

Aside from this, Daniel, Mallika's younger sister Leela, their childhood friend Munidasa Winslow (a veteran psychiatrist) and a former IT professional Eric Lee Meng Kai set up a mental welfare group in November 2012, which advocated and raised the awareness of mental health in Singapore, and ran self-help support groups for those living with mental illness and addictions. Mallika's two siblings and Dr Winslow also set up a non-profit organization in memory of Mallika, and this group oversaw the construction of orphanages in Nepal to help the children in need.

== See also ==
- Life imprisonment in Singapore
- List of major crimes in Singapore
