= ITE College Central murder =

2018 fatal stabbing of a woman in Singapore

- Low Hwee Geok, the 56-year-old victim
- Date: 19 July 2018; 8 years ago
- Location: ITE College Central, 2 Ang Mo Kio Drive, Singapore 567720
- Outcome: Seet Cher Hng serving one term of life imprisonment at Changi Prison
- Deaths: Low Hwee Geok (alias Michelle Low)
- Injuries: Seet Cher Hng (the killer)
- Convicted: Seet Cher Hng
- Verdict: Guilty
- Convictions: Murder under Section 300(c) of the Penal Code (one count)
- Sentence: Life imprisonment

On 19 July 2018, a 56-year-old woman named Low Hwee Geok (刘惠玉 Líu Huìyù), also known as Michelle Low, was attacked and stabbed at the carpark area of ITE College Central. The attacker, who was Low's ex-husband Seet Cher Hng (薛泽元 Xuē Zéyuán), had attempted suicide after stabbing his ex-wife eight times, but he was taken to hospital by the police and he survived his wounds. Low, however, died from the attack, resulting in Seet being arrested and charged with murder. Seet, who had a gambling habit, had been harassing his ex-wife for several years after their divorce for more money, alleging that his share of their condominium's sale proceeds was not fairly distributed. Three years later, Seet, then 69 years old, was found guilty of murdering Low by the High Court on 14 September 2021. Eight days later, Seet was sentenced to life imprisonment on 22 September 2021.

== Background ==
Seet Cher Hng, who had one sister, was born in 1952. Upon reaching adulthood, Seet married twice. He married his first wife in 1981 and they had a son before the couple divorced on an unspecified date. When Seet's first wife was approached by the media in 2018, she revealed she had not contacted Seet since their divorce and never wanted to have anything to do with him.

Seet met Low Hwee Geok (born in November 1961) when he was still employed in the training programme at Institute of Technical Education (ITE), and despite their age gap of nearly ten years, Seet and Low fell in love and married on 7 April 1993. They had one daughter together. Seet, however, had a compulsive addiction to gambling, and he often stole his wife's money to feed his gambling habit, racking up huge debts from gambling (this is the assumed reason for his first divorce). As his debts grew bigger, Low got wind of her husband's gambling habit, but out of consideration for their daughter and her belief that Seet would repent and quit gambling, she remained by his side and even helped pay off part of his debt. However, Seet persisted in his old ways despite his wife's tries to dissuade him from gambling.

During a 2008 family trip to Macau, when Seet disappeared to roam the local casinos to gamble, Low finally told her family members about Seet's gambling habits. After advice and persuasion from her relatives, Low decided to divorce Seet. The divorce request was finalized and granted on 13 June 2011. The couple's condominium at Corporation Road was sold off and the proceeds were divided between Low and Seet. Seet retired on 30 June 2017 and relied on his monthly Central Provident Fund (CPF) payouts.

Seet was unhappy with his share of the proceeds despite having confirmed the finalization of his and Low's shares. Seet blamed Low for being unfaithful to him and believed that had caused the divorce; the allegations of Low's infidelity was proven false. Seet also needed money to continue gambling. Between 2011 and 2018, he sent e-mails to Low, which contained numerous demands for money.

== Death of Low Hwee Geok ==
=== Premeditation ===
As a result of his anger and hatred towards his former wife, Seet Cher Hng decided to confront Low Hwee Geo and kill her. He prepared to commit suicide once he killed Low, should Low not agree to give him the money he would demand from her. On 19 July 2018, Seet armed himself with three knives, one of them engraved with "010609" and "020609", which allegedly represented dates of Low's infidelity. He also penned a total of four suicide notes to his daughter, sister, a friend and to the police between April and July 2018; some excerpts of these letters were revealed in court during Seet's 2021 murder trial. One of these notes, addressed to Seet's daughter, was quoted to have said, "I took your mummy (Low) for hurting Daddy (Seet)."

According to Hay Hung Chun, who prosecuted Seet for Low's murder, Seet's four letters conveyed a "palpable sense of resignation, finality and fatality", and these notes portrayed Seet as "a man who had finally screwed his courage to the sticking place after years of prevarication." These notes also demonstrated the intention Seet had harboured all along to engineer the death of his ex-wife.

=== Stabbing of Low and Seet's suicide attempt ===
On 19 July 2018, 66-year-old Seet Cher Hng rented a car and headed to the carpark of ITE College Central, where Low was working as the examinations director. He arrived at about 4:40 PM and stayed inside his vehicle, waiting for Low to appear, as he intended to attack her once she entered her car. Seet waited for three hours before he saw Low approaching her car. As Low got into her car, Seet got in on the passenger side and confronted his wife.

Upon the sight of her former husband, Low screamed loudly, and Seet held one of her arms. Low managed to exit the car, but immediately lost her footing and fell. Seeing that Low had collapsed, Seet charged towards Low and brandished his three knives, stabbing Low eight times. Seet then stabbed himself 13 times and collapsed. Several passers-by arrived because they heard the commotion, and called the police and ambulance. While Seet was rushed to hospital, 56-year-old Low Hwee Geok was pronounced dead at the scene by paramedics of the Singapore Civil Defence Force (SCDF). An autopsy report revealed that Low died as a result of three fatal wounds to the left sides of her chest, mid-back and lower back, and each of these wounds alone was sufficient to cause death.

Seet, who sustained grievous abdominal injuries, was rushed to the hospital, where he received surgery, which saved his life. He was later placed in the intensive care unit (ICU) until his discharge from hospitalization on 25 July 2018. By then, he had been placed under arrest for killing Low.

=== Reactions to Low's death ===
The Low's murder brought shock to many students and staff members, including Low's colleagues, of ITE College Central. They offered condolences to Low's family, and some of Low's colleagues acknowledged Low's exceptional professionalism in her job and her profound influence on her students. The parents of the students were reassured by the staff about the security and safety of the school, as the case was an isolated incident not related to the school, and classes took place as normal in the aftermath of the murder.

Several believers and a pastor of the church Low frequented for two years also showed sadness and shock for what happened to Low. Low, who originally came from a Confucianist family, converted to Christianity on 25 December 2017 at the church and often went there with her daughter to make prayers. She was known to be a gentle and good natured person who was committed to her new religion.

After her 18-year-old daughter recovered her body, Low's funeral was conducted and attended by 15 of her family members and friends. At the time of her death, Low, who was the seventh of eight daughters, left behind seven sisters, a mother, and her 18-year-old daughter. Seet's first ex-wife also expressed her extreme shock over the death of Low, whom she only met once.

== Fate of Seet Cher Hng ==
=== Arrest and conviction ===
During his hospitalization at Khoo Teck Puat Hospital, 66-year-old Seet Cher Hng was placed under arrest and charged with the murder of 56-year-old Low Hwee Geok. As the charge Seet faced was that of premeditated murder with intention to kill under Section 300(a) of the Penal Code (also the most serious of all four degrees of murder under Singapore law), Seet would be sentenced to death if he was found guilty of this offence.

Seet spent a total of three years in remand awaiting trial, and a psychiatric assessment revealed that Seet was not suffering from any major psychiatric disorder at the time of the stabbing, and was mentally fit to plead and stand trial.

In August 2021, the prosecution amended the original charge of intentional murder to a lesser murder charge under Section 300(c) of the Penal Code. This lesser charge dictates an offence of murder by intentionally inflicting an injury that could sufficiently result in death. A month after the amendment of the charge sheet, Seet was officially brought to trial on 14 September 2021 for Low's murder. By then, Seet expressed his intention to plead guilty to the amended charge and did not wish to give evidence. According to his lawyer, Wendell Wong, who described the case as a "painful family tragedy", Seet had taken "paramount consideration" to plead guilty so as to prevent his daughter and family from "reliving the tragedy". After an hour of hearing the case and receiving Seet's plea of guilt, the High Court convicted Seet of murdering Low. The sentencing trial of Seet was scheduled to take place eight days later on 22 September.

=== Sentence ===
Seet Cher Hng, who was sentenced to life in prison for his ex-wife's murder.

During the submissions on sentence, Deputy Public Prosecutor Hay Hung Chun, who was in charge of the prosecution, did not seek the death penalty, which was the maximum punishment any offender would face in Singapore for murder by an intentional injury resulting in death. The only other punishment for this charge was life imprisonment, which the prosecution did not object to when they expressed they would leave the sentence to the trial court's discretion.

Wendell Wong, Seet's defence lawyer, argued that Seet should be sentenced to life in prison. Wong highlighted Seet's grievances about their divorce in 2011; Seet sought to cast blame on Low for breaking up their marriage and dismissing his financial demands. However, the trial judge Aedit Abdullah of the High Court harshly reprimanded Wong for emphasising his mitigation plea on the numerous false allegations which Seet raised regarding the supposed financial disputes he had with Low. Justice Aedit also pointed out that the matter raised in mitigation was irrelevant to sentencing, and that with the victim being dead, she was not given a voice to tell her side of the story regarding the monetary issues that Seet brought forward against her in his unproven assertions. He also stated that this amounted to an abuse of the mitigation plea process as it was "not a forum for airing of grievances", since the mitigation plea was meant for judges to consider only the relevant factors of the case in order to decide between the sentence of life imprisonment and the death penalty for the offender.

Aside from his verbal remarks against Wong's conduct, Justice Aedit took note that the killing was deplorable in nature, and that the defendant had no right to justify his crime, deflect blame from himself, and attempt to reduce his culpability or seriousness of the crime, regardless of the reasons he made up or the grievances he harboured over the personal issues between himself and Low. Nonetheless, Justice Aedit found there were insufficient grounds in Seet's case which would have deserved the death penalty, given that in accordance to the Kho Jabing appeal ruling, the death penalty was strictly reserved to the most serious cases of murder where an offender, despite falling short of the intention to kill, exhibited viciousness and/or a blatant disregard for human life, as well as sparking outrage in the community due to the murder. The judge also stated that since the prosecution did not oppose to a life term, it would be "rare indeed for the court to impose a sentence not sought by any party to the proceedings."

As a result, on 22 September 2021, eight days after his conviction, 69-year-old Seet Cher Hng was sentenced to life imprisonment for Low's murder. Since the end of his sentencing trial, Seet is currently serving his life sentence at Changi Prison. Due to his age, he was spared from caning.

== Aftermath ==
In 2019, a year after the murder, there were considerations to implement more efficient security measures to tackle the safety lapses at all educational institutions in Singapore, as a result of the ITE College Central murder and several other on-campus incidents involving violence at schools.

After the end of Seet Cher Hng's sentencing in 2021, due to Seet's remorseless and baseless claims in court, Low Hwee Geok's sixth elder sister Stella Dumont (née Low) stepped up to express to the media that Seet's assertions of her second-youngest sister's alleged infidelity were not true, as the divorce was mainly perpetuated by Seet's incorrigible gambling habit. She laid out the instances where Seet took money without her sister's permission to feed his gambling habit. She pointed out that Seet had not objected to the finalization of the shares distributed between the couple and that Seet had met up with Low two years after their divorce to clarify and settle some of Seet's concerns about the monetary matters. Victor Dumont, Stella's husband, also stepped up to defend his late sister-in-law, stating that Seet, who had spent his money on gambling, kept harassing Low not out of his need to settle the shares but purely to get more money to gamble. It was also revealed that the Dumonts became the legal guardians of Low's daughter after her mother's murder and her father's arrest.

In August 2023, five years after the ITE College Central killing, Amanda Seet, the daughter of Low and Seet, first spoke to The Straits Times about her struggles to come to terms with the loss of her parents. Low's daughter, who was two months away from her 18th birthday when her mother was killed, stated that after she scattered her mother’s remains in the sea, she often felt a part of Low's presence whenever she was near the water. She also spoke about her mother's support for her passion in dance and remembered how Low's dedicated efforts inspired her to strive in these passions. She never spoke to her father after his incarceration, but stated she felt bad for the harsh comments people directed towards her father despite her hatred towards Seet for his actions. Low's daughter, who was currently pursuing a career related to dance and also gave dance lessons, stated that she found closure and healing through dance and she hoped to speak up in view of the rising occurrence of family violence in Singapore and to raise awareness on the need to help people cope with their trauma of losing a loved one.

The ITE College Central murder also brought renewed attention to several other high-profile cases involving family-related homicides committed in Singapore in the past few years. One of these cases included the 2017 Woodlands double murders, in which property agent Teo Ghim Heng received the death penalty for the premeditated murders of his daughter and pregnant wife eight days before Chinese New Year.

== See also ==
- 2018 in Singapore
- Woodlands double murders
- Life imprisonment in Singapore
- Capital punishment in Singapore
- List of major crimes in Singapore
