= One Leg Kicking =

2001 film by Khoo Koh

- Directed by: Khoo Koh
- Written by: Eric Khoo; Wei Koh; Redmund Law; James Toh
- Produced by: Eric Khoo; Daniel Yun
- Starring: Gurmit Singh; Mark Lee; Sharon Au; Moe Alkaff; Siva Choy; Kumar; Hossan Leong; Robin Leong; Lim Kay Tong; Moses Lim; Jack Neo; Fiona Xie
- Cinematography: David Park
- Edited by: Lawrence Ang
- Distributed by: United International Pictures Raintree Pictures Zhao Wei Films Singapore Film Communication
- Release dates: 14 November 2001 (Singapore); 2001 (Malaysia)
- Running time: 90 min.
- Country: Singapore
- Languages: English; Malay
- Budget: $230,000

One Leg Kicking is a 2001 Singaporean comedy film about several football amateurs who compete in a football event for the 2002 FIFA World Cup Finals. The film starred Gurmit Singh and Mark Lee.

== Plot ==
Tai Po and Vernon are shown to have a common pastime of playing soccer. Later, Tai Po enters a Youth Soccer Competition in a tryout, but gets hurt with his leg bleeding. Since that event, Tai Po appears to shun matches of soccer on the radio or on television while at work.

Handsome Toh is then shown into the film, released from prison as an ex-convict, also with Kim, who writes to her home back overseas.

Handsome arrives for a job interview, meeting Kim outside Sonny Lee's factory. They met Sonny's son Gavin who had returned to Singapore from studying in United States. Gavin interviews Toh and gave him a hard time but employs Toh on the condition that half of Toh's salary is donated to the company's soccer team.

Tai Po, Kim and Baka fail to fix a plumbing issue with a customer, and accidentally breaks the customers expensive glass bowl worth $15,000. Tai Po and Baka's promotion salary of $10,000 are forfeited to compensate the customer but still the company $5,000 for the outstanding amount.. However their boss, Sonny offers them to work overtime to repay what they owe and possibly earn back their promotion pay, by installing a swimming pool at Sonny's estate. Gavin suggests to his father to separate Baka and Tai Po and assigning Toh as Tai Po's partner.

Kim tells a horror story to Tai Po, which that somehow sours Handsome and his relation.

While watching television in Tai Po's home with Vernon and Tai Po's kids, they come across an advertisement for a Starhub soccer challenge which the winning team walks away with tickets to the 2002 World Cup Finals. Vernon suggests that they enter by calling his old soccer mates, but Tai Po reveals about his pairing with Handsome.

Vernon registers a team into the competition but had an encounter with the clerk, Eugene. Eugene becomes their team coach but was also as bad at soccer as the team. Tai Po fails to recruit Toh to trial for the team as Toh thought Tai Po was trying to challenge him to a fight.

Vernon asks about Sammy Best, a former soccer star, but his friend Ah Huat tells that Sammy now works at a construction site guard. Tai Po and Vernon try looking for him but was told by the construction site foreman that Sammy is now a drunkard. Tai Po and Vernon found two Brazilian soccer experts, Adriano and Vernato, sharing a meal with the construction workers after arriving in Singapore and were robbed. They recruited both Brazilians into their team and eventually also Toh as their goalkeeper.

The team fails even to a female soccer team, who are challenged straight by the Kosmos, Sonny's company team and Gavin is a player in it. The team, known as the Durians (suggested by Ah Huat who "sponsored") lost badly, getting laughed at by a drunkard field cleaner, who turns out to be Sammy himself. It was quite a hassle to get Sammy as their coach, but soon the Durians succeed winning a match.

The Durians go to a KTV pub, where Handsome while singing a love song remembers Gwen, Gavin's sister, and breaks out in tears while trying to confess his love for her. But he then finds Kim as a KTV girl, getting beaten up after trying to save her. He then realises he has anger management problems, resorting always to fights to settle issues. Kim tries to pacify him, also inspiring herself to be what she wants.

In a party Gavin held, he is revealed to be keeping a Barbie doll, showing his extreme sadism he tries to hide from others.

Tai Po's daughter Chun Huey is told off by her teacher, and Tai Po goes angry, trying to teach his children a lesson that he is a failure, but his children then tell him that he is in fact a great father, even with their deceased mother who Tai Po thought he had failed to take care of.

Vernon is soon fired by his uncle at the KTV they work in, as Vernon's concerts scared customers away, resulting in the Karaoke machines replacing him. "Vernon and the Vibrations" supposedly ended their career. Vernon is also told off by his father who claims that he should wake up, becoming a singer was impossible for him.

Gavin's sadism and extreme life gets on Gwen's nerves, who then resigns being the Kosmos team manager, telling off Sonny. Sonny himself, like his son becomes a sadist, even going so far to being harsh on Tai Po when Tai Po was previously his best worker.

The finals to the match is soon, but the Durians and Kosmos go for a dinner party held by the organisers. In the party, the Kosmos bully the Durians, and Gwen appears to seduce Handsome while they were outside smoking. That had then broke Kim's heart, and enrages Gavin who threatens to report Handsome for molesting Gwen. Handsome angrily apologises, fortunately controlling his anger at his one enemy. Later, Vernon criticises Handsome for rejecting Kim, but Handsome criticises back about Vernon's horrid singing. The fight ends abruptly when Sammy is admitted into the hospital for liver failure. Tai Po is held down by the bill, also by his cut salary for playing soccer and not working.

Sonny then approaches Tai Po, offering him 10 grand to him and the team, for their own usage. Tai Po is also relieved of building the swimming pool. However, if the money is taken, the Durians must not play in the match the next day, or Handsome, Kim, Baka and himself will be fired.

The Durians meet up, which they discuss their future. Tai Po has his bills to settle, Vernon has his life to handle, and Kim has her family to support. They were thinking of giving up the match, but Eugene then scolds them for being shallow. They now are at crossroads.

While visiting, Sammy tells Tai Po that he really is not a failure, Tai Po was a good player in the Youth Soccer tryouts when younger, and Sammy had seen it.

The match was about to start but most of the Durians' team are missing. Tai Po, Baka and Toh decided to return Sonny his money and to resign from his company. Before the start of the match, the members of the Durians arrive and was able to play the game. Things do not look hopeful, until Adriano and Vernato escape the clutches of their abusive foreman and quit being construction workers, arriving at the match, bringing their cheering soccer fanatic construction worker mates.

Sammy sneaks out of the hospital to see the game, Vernon's father watches his son and Kim supports Handsome. Tai Po realises he indeed can succeed, and Vernon does something which he has not done before. Handsome also controls his anger perfectly in front of Gavin, in which Gavin's reaction has the referee offering him a red card but sends back another player.

Tai Po is tackled down hard by Gavin, but he tries his best and scores the final goal to win. The Durians triumph, while Gavin weeps over his lost girlfriend (who ironically was stolen by none other than his father) and is appalled by his doll which he claims has stopped loving him and in a fit of rage decapitates the doll, exasperating him.

Tai Po, Baka, Handsome and Kim start a mobile phone shop, also having Kim and Handsome married. Tai Po has taken his kids on a holiday, and is now more well off. Vernon now has a singing career, settling in Las Vegas in America while Sammy is now a full-time soccer coach with Eugene. He signs his autograph to a customer who finds out their identity as the film ends.

== Cast ==
- Gurmit Singh as Tai Po
- Moe Alkaff as Vernon
- Mark Lee as Handsome Toh
- Sharon Au as Kim
- Lim Kay Tong as Sonny Lee
- Robin Leong as Gavin
- Hossan Leong as Eugene
- Siva Choy as Sammy Best
- Jack Neo as construction foreman
- Fiona Xie as Gwen
- Matthew Tong as Ah Boy

== Production ==
The film was produced on a budget less than a million dollars with 40 percent of the cost covered by endorsements. The script was completed in November 2000 and filming started in March 2001.

== Reception ==
The film was criticised for its abundance of product placement in various scenes. Executive producer Eric Khoo defended this by stating that it was necessary to cover costs with a tight budget in a bad film climate through sponsoring. The film was also accused of being a copy of Stephen Chow's Shaolin Soccer, but Khoo said that this was just a coincidence.
