= List of military training deaths in Singapore =

Singapore maintains an active conscription system in accordance with the regulations set by the Government of Singapore, known as National Service (NS). This requires all qualified male Singaporean citizens and second-generation permanent residents to serve a period of active duty military service in the uniformed services, in either the Singapore Armed Forces (SAF), Singapore Civil Defence Force (SCDF) or the Singapore Police Force (SPF). Below is a list of reported deaths that resulted from training incidents.

== Service-related deaths in Singapore ==
National serviceman	Date	Age	Incident	Place
Recruit (REC) Allen Tan Chong Huat	24 October 1968	19	Fatally stung by hornets.	Chua Chu Kang, Singapore
Second Lieutenant (2LT) Tay Seow Kai	26 August 1970	21	2LT Tay grabbed a grenade from a recruit who fumbled while handling the grenade during a live exercise. The grenade detonated in his hand, killing him and causing minor injuries for 2 others.	Singapore Armed Forces Training Institute, Singapore
Recruit (REC) Lim Soon Aik	15 September 1977	19	Recruit Lim Soon Aik was shot in the stomach during a live firing exercise by another soldier who negligently discharged his AR-15. He died 2 weeks later from septicaemia.	Nee Soon, Singapore
Private (PTE) Edward Rengasamy	29 August 1981	18	Soldier died after iron piece pierced his throat during SAF Display Rehearsal	West Coast Park, Singapore
Sergeant (SGT) Goh Cheng Beng	13 April 1982	27	Fatally injured during a training exercise.	
Corporal (CPL) Tamil Selvam s/o Suppiah	9 October 1982	22	Fatally wounded in a training exercise.	Sembawang, Singapore
Private (PTE) Chin Jee Yat	17 May 1983	20	He was inflating the tyre of a five-tonne truck when it exploded, killing him and injuring another soldier	
Private (PTE) Tham Wai Keong	23 May 1983	18	Tham was found dead a day after he had gone missing from a route march. The state coroner reported that the private died from a ruptured stomach, but an open verdict was recorded as a forensic pathologist was unable to exclude the possibility that Tham was hit by the entrenching tool found next to his body.	Pulau Tekong, Singapore
Lieutenant (LTA) Koh Meah Wan	10 April 1984	23	Died of unspecified "serious injuries" during a training exercise.	Sungei Gedong, Singapore
Recruit (REC) Sim Keat Kee	13 April 1984	19	Collapsed during a two-kilometre run.	-
Recruit (REC) Bak Yow Hock	18 April 1984	17	Died while undergo training at School of Naval Training.	Sembawang, Singapore
Lance-Corporal (LCP) Lim Kian Lee	23 January 1986	19	On 17 January, he had a swimming lesson. He had difficulty swimming at the deep end of the pool and was found at the bottom of the pool. He was pulled up and died of bronchopneumonia on 23 January.	NCO Club, Singapore
Private (PTE) Hay Yong Chye	26 November 1986	19	Buried alive.	Sarimbun Ave, Singapore
Staff Sergeant (SSG) Goh Kim Loong; Corporal (CPL) Ramiya Mohan; Lieutenant (LTA) Ng Soon Hup; Lieutenant (LTA) Siow Poh Guan; Lieutenant (LTA) Wee Tong Leong; Captain (CPT) Lakbir Singh	24 January 1987	-	Helicopter crash.	Near Brunei International Airport, Brunei
Sergeant Chin Kian Min	26(?) February 1987	29	Reported missing while training at sea on 26 February. His body was recovered on 28 February	
Staff-Sergeant Daniel M.L. de Rozario	17 July 1987	34	Gunshot wound	Mowbray Camp, Singapore
Corporal (First Class) Tan Pheng Huat, Corporal (First Class) Ng Eng Wah, Corporal Ang Yee Khoon	16 July 1990	-	Fell from a helicopter when the ropes they were attached to were released prematurely.	Lower Peirce Reservoir
Private (PTE) Lim Chee Keng	19 February 1994	21	Collapsed at the end of a 10-kilometre run.	Kranji, Singapore
Private PTE(NS) Lim Cheng Teck	21 August 1994	34	Found unconscious, brought to hospital and died there.	Kranji Camp, Singapore
Second Lieutenant (2LT) Zulhelmi Mohammad Said	3 August 1996	20	Struck by lightning while moving his platoon out of a training area due to bad weather.	Lim Chu Kang, Singapore
Officer Cadet Trainee (OCT) Tan Sek Hong	9 December 1996	19	Tan Choon Ming (OCT), 20, loaded a general purpose machine gun without permission and meddled with its trigger in front of a group of officer cadets trainees. He shot Tan Sek Hong, 19, in the chest. Tan later died of a gun shot wound.	Rest area of the live-firing area of Safti Camp, off Upper Jurong Road
Third Sergeant (3SG) Ronnie Tan Han Chong; Lance Corporal (LCP) Low Yin Tit	9 March 1997	-	A 155mm artillery round exploded in the barrel of a FH-2000 howitzer during a live-firing exercise conducted by the 23rd Battalion, Singapore Artillery. Twelve other servicemen were injured in the incident, including a liaison officer from the New Zealand Army. The explosion was caused by a defective fuze supplied by the Chartered Ammunition Industries which failed to ensure that the fuzes procured by its contractor met military specifications.	Waiouru Army Camp, New Zealand
Private (PTE) Tan Chin Seng	3 April 1997	21	Died of injuries caused by a light anti-tank round explosion. Five others were injured.	Pasir Laba live-firing area
Third Sergeant (3SG) Lim Yew Teck	9 February 1998	-	Found unconscious in camp, evacuated by helicopter to Singapore General Hospital and died there	Khatib Camp, Singapore
Captain (CPT) Teddy Quah Kok Meng	11 December 1999	-	Died after the vehicle he was travelling in crashed into a tree.	Shoalwater Bay Training Area, Queensland, Australia
Captain (CPT) Lim Kim Hock	02 November 2000	-	An Air Force Weapons Systems Officer was perished onboard SQ 006 was on his way to attend the Advanced Fighter Weapons Instructor Course at the Air National Guard, USA.	Taoyuan International Airport, Taipei, Taiwan
Second Lieutenant (2LT) Daryl Loh Chuan Rong	26 February 2001	-	A Full-Time National Serviceman. Thrown overboard as the Missile Gunboat he was on suddenly accelerated and struck another gunboat.	Changi Naval Base, Singapore
Corporal (CPL) Kwok Wei Ming	29 October 2001	20	A Full-Time National Serviceman. Collapsed during a Commando Battalion training and died in camp after being transported to its medical facility.	Hendon Camp, Singapore
Lance-Corporal (LCP) (NS) Mohd Shahlan bin Abdul Rahim	15 May 2002	-	Collapsed while taking his Individual Physical Proficiency Test (IPPT), and died in hospital.	Clementi Camp, Singapore
Recruit (REC) Ivan Ho Yong Hua	10 Oct 2002	-	Found unconscious at training ground and died in hospital.	Pulau Tekong, Singapore
First Sergeant (1SG) Heng Sock Ling, First Sergeant (1SG) Seah Ai Leng, Second Sergeant (2SG) Chua Bee Lin, Corporal (CPL) Goh Hui Ling	3 January 2003	-	The four sailors were in their sleeping quarters in the stern of RSS Courageous. A collision between RSS Courageous and a merchant vessel sheared off the stern of RSS Courageous, killing the four sailors.	waters off Pedra Branca, Singapore
Second Sergeant (2SG) Hu Enhuai	21 August 2003	-	Died from asphyxia and near drowning during a POW survival training course. Four commando officers conducting the training were jailed for carrying out an inappropriate "dunking" procedure that led to his death.	Pulau Tekong, Singapore
First Sergeant (1SG) Shiva s/o Mohan	13 July 2005	-	Accident while performing heli-borne rappelling. Also involved one other foreign serviceman.	Sembawang Airbase
Recruit (REC) Andrew Cheah Wei Siong	10 June 2008	-	Fainted during a 2 kilometre training walk as part of the enhanced Basic Military Training (BMT) for obese recruits. He was evacuated by helicopter to Singapore General Hospital where he was pronounced dead.	Pulau Tekong, Singapore
Second-Lieutenant (2LT) Lam Jia Hao Clifton (Note: Posthumously awarded the title of Second-Lieutenant (2nd Lt).)	12 June 2008	20	Collapsed during a jungle orientation training in Brunei; died in hospital.	Brunei
Private (PTE) Foo Wei Rong Joe	1 October 2008	20	Collapsed while doing pull-ups. He was later evacuated to Tengah Medical Centre, where the doctors tried to resuscitate him. He subsequently sent to National University Hospital while the medical doctor and medic continued their resuscitation attempt en route, but was subsequently pronounced dead.	Lim Chu Kang Camp, Singapore
First Warrant Officer (1WO) Tan Poh Eng	21 May 2009	53	Died in a parachuting accident.	Bloemfountein, South Africa
2nd Warrant Officer (2WO) Poh Eng Huat	April 2009	36	Found unconscious at 6.05pm in a flight crew room after performing 'tunnel crawl demo of an F-5 Tiger aircraft. He was later sent to the Changi General Hospital where the SAF doctors and medics team continued their attempts to resuscitate him en route to the hospital. Unfortunately, he was pronounced dead at 7:24pm at the Changi General Hospital.	Paya Lebar Airbase, Singapore
2nd Lieutenant (2LT) Nicholas Chan Wei Kit	3 July 2009	23	Hit backwards by a reversing Land Rover driven by Private Muhammad Abdul Qaiyuum Muhammed Iskander at the garage while 2LT Nicholas was performing engine checks behind the vehicle.	Seletar Camp, Singapore
Lance Corporal (LCP) Eugin Wee Yong Choon	28 January 2011	20	Hit by a truck driven by another serviceman while unloading stores.	Jurong Camp, Singapore
Specialist Cadet Trainee (SCT) Ee Chun Sheng	2 August 2011	21	Found not breathing after separated from his teammates during a training exercise. Due to either "natural disease process" caused by a heart defect or possible heat stroke.	Ama Keng Training Area, Lim Chu Kang, Singapore
Corporal (CPL) Li Hong Yang	10 January 2012	28	Collapsed after completing the 2.4 kilometre run in the IPPT.	Kranji Camp, Singapore
Private (PTE) Dominique Sarron Lee Rui Feng	17 April 2012	21	Breathing difficulties triggered by an allergic reaction to smoke grenades. COI found out that CPT Najib Hanuk Bin Muhamad Jalal was responsible for throwing 6 smoke grenades (three times more than needed for training). Death could have been prevented if Safety officer CPT (now LTC) Chia Thye Siong had stopped CPT Najib.	Murai Urban Training Facility
Third Sergeant (3SG) Tan Mou Sheng	10 May 2012	20	Found pinned to his jeep and unconscious after its driver, 3SG Cavin Tan, lost control of the vehicle.	Marsiling, Singapore
Lance Corporal (LCP) Muhammad Fahrurrazi Bin Salim	12 August 2012	20	Went missing during a jungle training exercise. He was the coxswain in a convoy of four boats meant to support water crossing segment of the exercise. His body was found three days later, 200 metres from his last known position.	Sungai Batu Apoi river, Temburong District, Brunei
Lance-Corporal (LCP) (NS) Tan Tai Seng	27 September 2012	23	Hit by falling tree while waiting to enter training area.	Ama Keng Training Area, Lim Chu Kang, Singapore
Third Sergeant (3SG) Chan Hiang Cheng Gavin	15 September 2017	21	His Bionix Infantry Fighting Vehicle toppled sideways while he was guiding it out of difficult terrain; he was heli-evacuated to Rockhampton Hospital, where he succumbed to his injuries.	Shoalwater Bay Training Area, Queensland, Australia
Corporal First Class (CFC) Lee Han Xuan Dave (Note: Posthumously awarded the title of Corporal First Class (CFC).)	30 April 2018	19	Displayed signs of hyperthermia on 18 April after completing an 8 kilometre fast march. Lee was evacuated to the camp's medical centre and subsequently transferred to Changi General Hospital, where he was warded in an intensive care unit, but his condition only worsened.	Bedok Camp, Singapore
Corporal First Class (CFC) Liu Kai (Note: Posthumously awarded the title of Corporal First Class (CFC).)	3 November 2018	22	Killed in a training accident when a Bionix AFV vehicle reversed into his Land Rover during a training exercise.	Murai Urban Training Facility
Corporal First Class (CFC) (NS) Aloysius Pang	24 January 2019	28	Died four days after sustaining severe chest and abdominal injuries when the barrel of a self-propelled Howitzer was lowered while he was repairing it with two other SAF personnel during Exercise Thunder Warrior.	Waiouru Military Camp, New Zealand
