= Zul Sutan =

Singaporean singer and guitarist (1957–2018)

- Born: 27 February 1957; Singapore
- Died: 5 December 2018 (aged 61); Singapore
- Occupations: Singer and guitarist

Zul Sutan (27 February 1957 – 5 December 2018) was a Singaporean singer and guitarist. A local music icon, Zul as frontman of rock band Tania became a household name in Singapore's music scene in a career spanning more than 40 years. He died of health complications at National University Hospital on 5 December 2018, aged 61.
