= Competition and Consumer Commission of Singapore =

Singaporean government agency

Agency overview
- Formed: 1 January 2005; 21 years ago (as Competition Commission of Singapore); 1 April 2018; 8 years ago (as Competition and Consumer Commission of Singapore)
- Jurisdiction: Singapore
- Headquarters: 45 Maxwell Road #09-01 The URA Centre Singapore (069118)
- Agency executives: Max Loh Khum Whai, Chairman; Alvin Koh, Chief Executive
- Parent department: Ministry of Energy, Trade and Industry
- Website: www.cccs.gov.sg
- Agency ID: T08GB0010E

The Competition and Consumer Commission of Singapore (CCS) is Singapore's competition regulator. It was first established as the Competition Commission of Singapore on 1 January 2005 as a statutory board under the Ministry of Energy, Trade and Industry, taking up its current name on 1 April 2018 to reflect its new role in consumer rights, a role previously under SPRING Singapore.

CCS enforces the Competition Act 2004, and has broad legal powers to investigate and penalize infringing parties. It also enforces the Consumer Protection (Fair Trading) Act, which protects consumers against unfair trade practices in Singapore.

== Management ==
Chief Executive Officer
Date	CEO	Comments
1 October 2019 - 31 March 2024	Sia Aik Kor	
1 April 2024	Alvin Koh (高明新)	
