= Interactive & Digital Media Centre =

Singapore Polytechnic organisation to advance the use of Interactive & Digital Media

Interactive & Digital Media Centre (IDMC@SP)

Quick Facts
- Centre Director: Peter Leong
- Location: InnoVillage@SP, 500 Dover Road, Singapore
- Established: April 1, 2007
- Website: www.sp.edu.sg/idmc
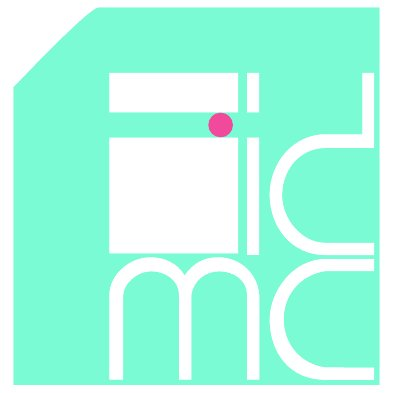
- Logo

The Interactive & Digital Media Centre (Abbreviation: IDMC@SP) is an organization in Singapore Polytechnic that aims to support Singapore enterprises (especially SMEs) in enhancing their use of Interactive and Digital Media (IDM). Launched in 2007, the vision for IDMC@SP was to establish it as a centre of excellence for R&D work in the areas of Interactive and Digital Media. IDM projects are submitted to IDM Programme Office and IDA, and MOE for R&D funding.

== Unreal Technology (UT) Living Lab ==
RTIS Living Lab gallery

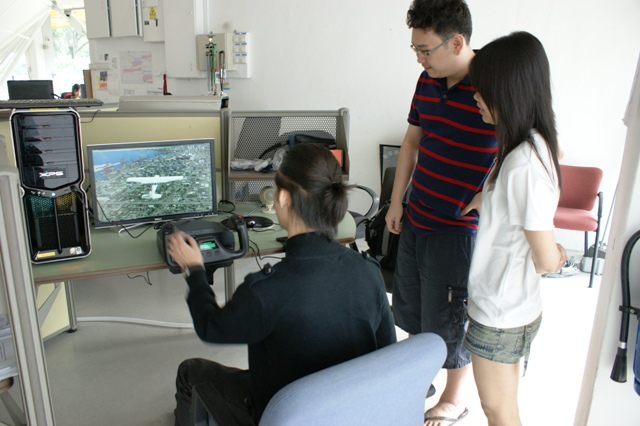
Students working on Flight Simulation

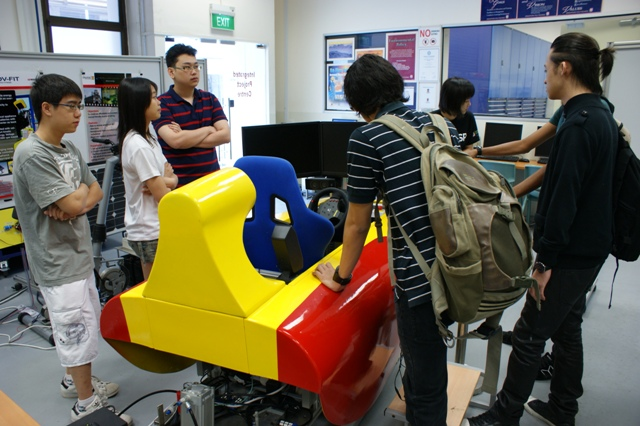
Motion Simulator

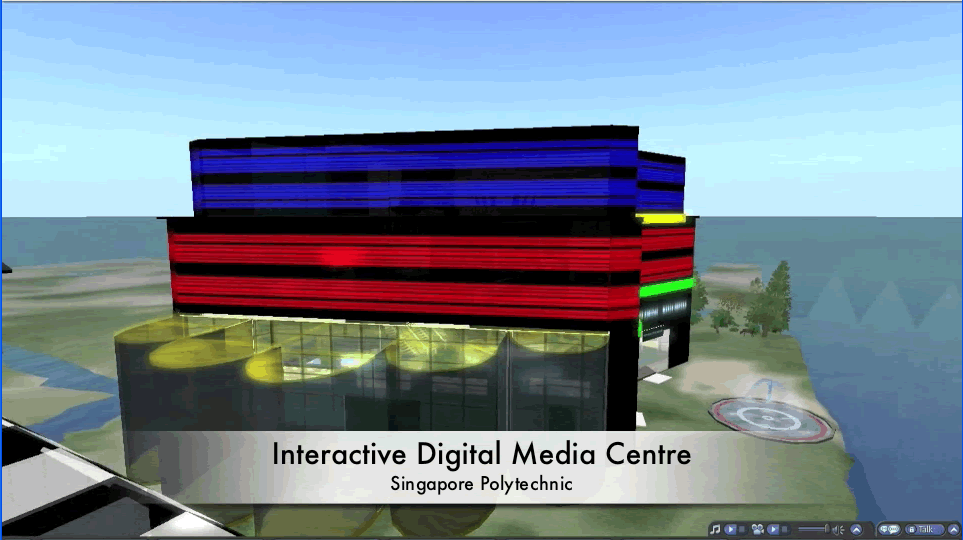
Second Life IDMC

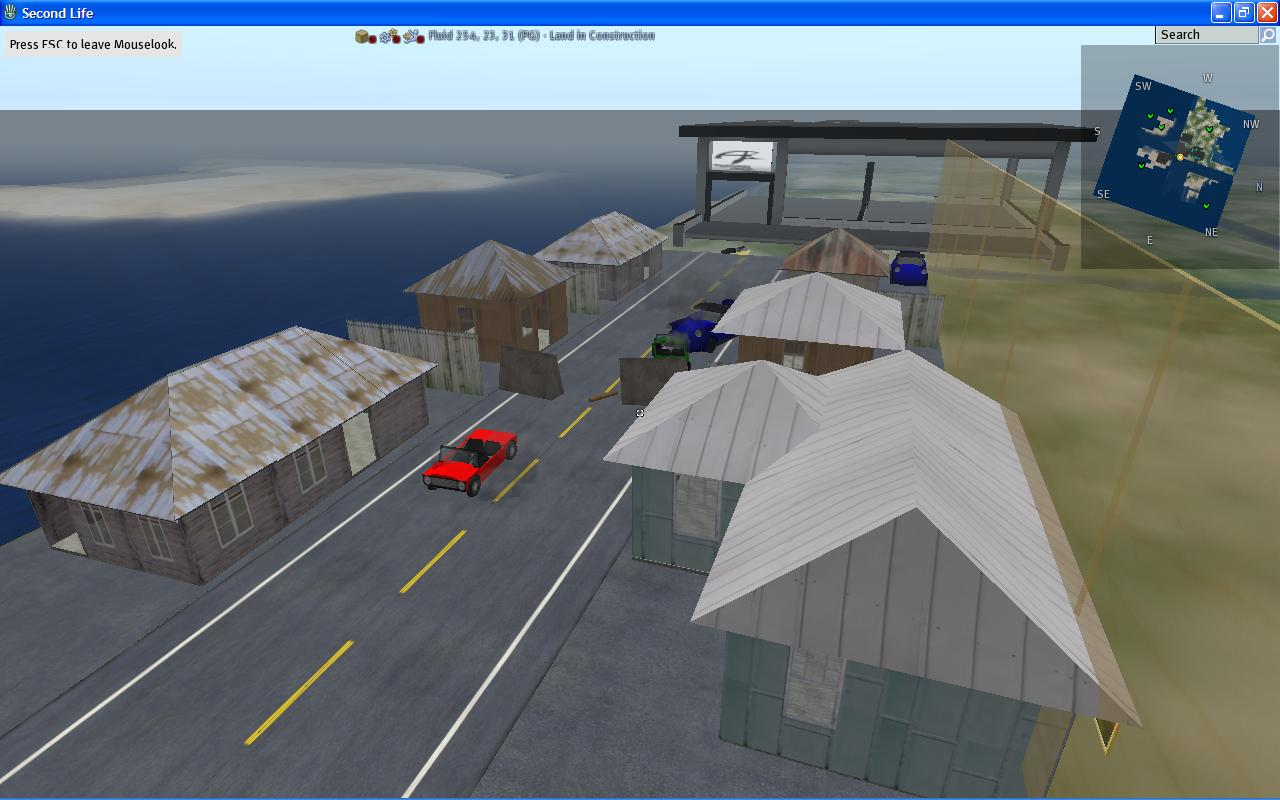
Virtual World Hollywood

== See also ==
- Ministry of Information, Communications and the Arts (Singapore)
- Media Development Authority of Singapore
- Infocomm Development Authority of Singapore
- SPRING Singapore
- Singapore Polytechnic
- Government of Singapore
- Economy of Singapore
