= Siva Choy =

Singaporean musician (1947–2018)

Sivanandan Choy
- Choy in 2004
- Born: May 22, 1947; Colony of Singapore
- Died: 4 March 2018 (aged 70); Perth, Australia
- Education: University of Singapore (BA)
- Occupation: Musician
- Years active: 1957–2018
- Spouse: Ilsa Sharp (m. 1986)
- Musical career
- Origin: Singapore
- Genres: R&B; Rap
- Instruments: Vocals; guitar; piano
- Labels: Philips Records; RCA Records; Pony Canyon; Viyo Records

Sivanandan Choy (22 May 1947 – 4 March 2018), better known as Siva Choy, was a Singaporean musician, comedian and writer, known for his Singlish rap classic "Why U So Like Dat?", released in 1991.

== Early life and education ==
Sivanandan Choy was born to an Indian family in Gillman Barracks, in Alexandra. His father, was from Kerala, India, and moved to Singapore to work as a civilian foreman for the British Army, managing a British military power station located in Gillman Barracks. His mother, was born in Singapore to M K Chathukutty, a migrant from Kerala and founder of the Singapore Malayalee Hindu Samajam (SMHS), and Ammalu Amma, a migrant from Tamil Nadu. As a migrant, his father went to SMHS to look for jobs, and was introduced to Chathukutty's daughter and eventually got married.

Choy was the youngest of three brothers.

Choy was supposed to be Choyi, like his father's; a clerk at the registry issuing his father's identity card spelt it as Choi. When Choy was born, a clerk at the hospital made another mistake by spelling his surname as Choy instead of Choi, making him the only person in his family with the surname Choy.

Living in Gillman Barracks in his early childhood, Choy listed to music in different languages, including as English, Malay, Tamil, Mandarin and Hindustani. Choy attended Pasir Panjang Primary School, where he learnt how to play a recorder and a guitar, and together with his brother, James, they were known as the Cyclones, and pioneered the local R&B scene. While attending Bartley Secondary School, Choy often performed in plays and took part in singing competitions.

In 1969, Choy graduated from the University of Singapore with a Bachelor of Arts with honours in philosophy, political science and English.

== Career ==
In 1964, the Cyclones joined the Checkmates to be their lead vocalists, performing regularly at tea dances organised by the Golden Venus club located along Orange Grove Road in Tanglin. After being offered a contract by Philips Records, the Cyclones released two EPs, one in 1965 and another in 1967. Later, Vernon Cornelius joined the band, and the band was renamed as Unit 4+2+1, inspired by popular British group Unit 4+2.

In 1967, Unit 4+2+1 disbanded as the members began working regular jobs, and Cornelius left the band to join The Quests. Together with members of the Comancheros, Choy formed the X-periments and released two singles and two LPs under RCA Records.

Upon graduation from university, Choy worked as a journalist for Fanfare, an entertainment magazine published by Straits Times Press. In 1971, Choy also worked briefly as a correspondent for New Nation.

Thereafter, Choy spent five years busking in Europe and another year cycling from Holland to Singapore, before starting a job in the advertising industry in 1976. Choy also authored the popular Kitchi Boy stories, which told the story of a group of local boys in Singlish and colloquial humour. Eventually, the stories were compiled as books Oh No, It's The Kitchi Boy Gang and I'm Sorry, It's Kitchi Boy Again, published in 1985 and 1986 respectively.

In 1990, Choy moved to Perth for retirement, while occasionally returning to Singapore to perform. Choy also played in two blues bands, performing in gigs and shows across Australia.

In 1991, together with comedy group Kopi Kat Klan, Choy released an album titled Why U So Like Dat?, consisting of Singlish songs and sketches. The album sold more than 50,000 copies, and its title song enjoyed frequent radio airplays. In 1998, the album was issued as a CD, containing 11 tracks from the original cassette version and seven new tracks.

From 1999 to 2012, Choy wrote a column for The New Paper.

== Personal life ==
In 1986, Choy married Ilsa Sharp, a freelance writer based in Singapore.

After two strokes, Choy was hospitalised at Sir Charles Gairdner Hospital and was in a coma for two days. He died on 4 March 2018.

== Discography ==
- The Cyclones (1965)

Side 1
No.	Title	Writer(s)	Length
1.	"I'll"	Lawrence Lee	2:58
2.	"Oh No, She Didn't Say"	James Choy, Siva Choy	2:26
Total length:			5:24

Side 2
No.	Title	Writer(s)	Length
1.	"She's Mine All Mine"	Lawrence Lee	3:03
2.	"The Dew"	James Choy, Siva Choy	2:04
Total length:			5:07

- The Cyclones (1967)

Side 1
No.	Title	Writer(s)	Length
1.	"Your Thoughts, Your Cares And You"	James Choy, Siva Choy	3:22
2.	"A New Man"	Lawrence Lee	2:32
Total length:			5:54

Side 2
No.	Title	Writer(s)	Length
1.	"Stop Your Sobbing"	Davies	2:50
2.	"I'll Be Home"	Ned Washington, S Lewis	3:45
Total length:			6:35

- Why U So Like Dat? (1991)

All lyrics are written by Siva Choy.

1991 Cassette edition: This side
No.	Title	Music	Length
1.	"Why U So Like Dat"	Siva Choy	1:52
2.	"The Debate"		7:44
3.	"Newsflash"
4.	"DJ De Souza"	Derek Zuzarte	6:06
5.	"Newsflash #2"
6.	"Me, You & SDU"		3:41
7.	"R-rated Movies"		2:57

All lyrics are written by Siva Choy.

1991 Cassette edition: That side
No.	Title	Music	Length
1.	"The Tunnel"		3:09
2.	"The Debt Collector"		7:21
3.	"Commercial Break"
4.	"Beer & Mee Goreng & Albinoni"	Siva Choy	2:47
5.	"Be Smart, Don't Smoke"
6.	"Weekend Dracula"		6:24
7.	"News At Ten"		0:41

All tracks are written by Farid Long, Martin Tang, Siva Choy.

1998 CD edition
No.	Title	Artist	Length
1.	"Why U So Like Dat?"	Siva Choy	1:52
2.	"Hey Gumak, Gumak"	Annie Tan	2:36
3.	"The Debate"	Siva Choy	7:44
4.	"The Tunnel"	Siva Choy	3:09
5.	"The Back-seat Driver...The Wife?"	Siva Choy	2:18
6.	"News at Ten"	Siva Choy	0:41
7.	"Beer, Mee Goreng & Albinoni"	Faridah Ali	2:47
8.	"Getting Thru' to the Boss!"	Siva Choy	3:59
9.	"The Debt Collector"	Siva Choy	7:21
10.	"DJ De Souza"	Siva Choy	6:06
11.	"Me, You & SDU"	Siva Choy	3:41
12.	"The 5 Cs"	Siva Choy	2:45
13.	"R-Rated Movies"	Siva Choy	2:57
14.	"Weekend Dracula"	Siva Choy	6:24
15.	"Airline Reservation"	Siva Choy	2:19
16.	"One Fine Summer Morning"	S. Rajagopal	2:39
17.	"Night Training"	Siva Choy	2:42
18.	"Oooh Baby"	Jay Shotam	0:36
Total length:			60:02

== Filmography ==
=== Film ===
Year	Title	Role
2001	One Leg Kicking	Sammy Best

== Bibliography ==
- Kitchi Boy (1985). Oh No, It's the Kitchi Boy Gang!. Singapore: Times Books International. ISBN 978-9-9716-5220-3.
- Kitchi Boy (1986). I'm Sorry, It's Kitchi Boy Again!. Singapore: Times Books International. ISBN 978-9-9716-5223-4.
