= International Enterprise Singapore =

Former statutory board of the Singapore Government

Agency overview
- Formed: 1 January 1983; 43 years ago (as Singapore Trade Development Board); 2002; 24 years ago (as International Enterprise Singapore)
- Dissolved: 1 April 2018; 8 years ago
- Superseding agency: Enterprise Singapore
- Jurisdiction: Government of Singapore
- Headquarters: 230 Victoria Street, Level 10, Bugis Junction Office Tower, Singapore 188024
- Agency executives: Seah Moon Ming, Chairman; Lee Ark Boon, Chief Executive Officer
- Parent agency: Ministry of Trade and Industry
- Agency ID: T08GB0024E

International Enterprise Singapore (IE Singapore) was a statutory board under the Ministry of Trade and Industry of the Government of Singapore. It facilitated the growth of Singapore-based companies overseas and promoted international trade. On 1 April 2018, IE Singapore merged with SPRING Singapore to form Enterprise Singapore.

== History ==
The Singapore Trade Development Board (TDB) formed on 1 January 1983 to develop Singapore as an international trading hub and to promote Singaporean goods and services. Activities ranged from basic trade facilitation, to reviewing existing marketing policies, strategies and techniques. It explored opportunities in both traditional and non-traditional markets, and subsequently exported business systems and developed international offshore trading. It also had a role in trade policy after Singapore joined the General Agreement on Tariffs and Trade, to actively secure market access and lobby for free trade. It issued its own revenue stamps as well.

In 2002, it was renamed as International Enterprise Singapore.

The re-branding coincided with an acknowledgment that Singapore had to move beyond its investment-led and electronics-dominated export base and to diversify her sources of growth. One of the key thrusts in Singapore's new economic strategy was to help Singapore-based companies internationalize and grow in an increasingly global market. TDB was thus renamed International Enterprise Singapore (IE Singapore) on 12 April 2002 to mark a strategic shift in activities, which would then focus less on export promotion, and more on helping Singaporean business start and develop their business overseas.

In this way, IE Singapore was analogous to other trade and export promotion agencies such as the Australian Trade Commission (Austrade) and the Japan External Trade Organization. However, their roles differed to reflect the different economic strategies envisaged by their respective governments, which also depended on the relative profile and orientation of their economies. IE Singapore, for example, focused also on investment matters, while organizations such as JETRO have also shifted to activities such as import promotion. It was one of many examples of Trade Promotion Agencies (TPOs) internationally facing change, and had adjusted their mission appropriately to suit the times.

On 1 April 2018, IE Singapore merged with SPRING Singapore to form Enterprise Singapore.
