= Enterprise Singapore =

Development board in Singapore aimed at small and medium businesses

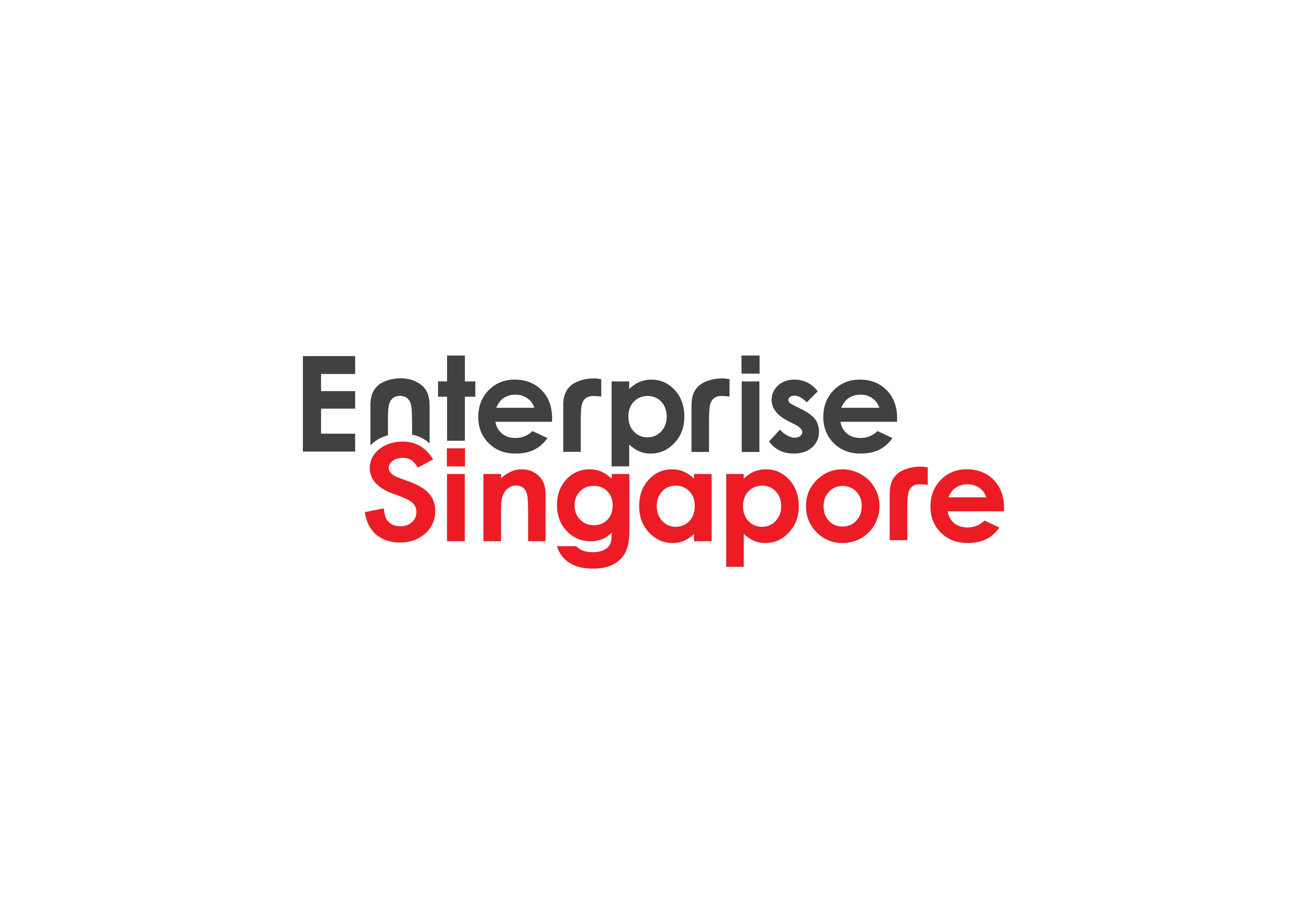

Agency overview
- Formed: 1 April 2018; 8 years ago
- Preceding agencies: International Enterprise Singapore; SPRING Singapore
- Jurisdiction: Government of Singapore
- Headquarters: 230 Victoria Street, Level 9, Bugis Junction Towers, Singapore 188024
- Employees: 1400+
- Agency executives: Lee Chuan Teck, Executive Chairman; Cindy Khoo, Managing Director
- Parent agency: Ministry of Energy, Trade and Industry
- Website: www.enterprisesg.gov.sg
- Agency ID: T18GB0001K

Enterprise Singapore (EnterpriseSG) is a statutory board under the Ministry of Energy, Trade and Industry of the Government of Singapore. It was formed on 1 April 2018 through the merger of International Enterprise Singapore and SPRING Singapore. The agency oversees programs related to small-and medium-sized enterprises (SMEs), as well as national standards and accreditation.

== History ==
Enterprise Singapore was formed through the merger of International Enterprise Singapore (IE Singapore) and SPRING Singapore, integrating the functions of both organisations. Before the merger, SPRING Singapore focused on standards and accreditation as well as enterprise development for local businesses, while IE Singapore concentrated on trade promotion.

On 5 February 2018, the Parliament of Singapore passed a bill to formalize the establishment of the new unified statutory board.

== Responsibilities ==
=== Quality and standards ===
Through the Singapore Standards Council, EnterpriseSG administers the Singapore Standardisation Programme (SSP). The Council consists of professionals from industry, trade, consumer associations, academia, and government-linked agencies. It develops standards for the Singapore stock market and promotes their adoption among stakeholders involved in doing business in Singapore.

The agency is also the national accreditation body. Enterprise Singapore manages the Singapore Accreditation Council (SAC), which develops and manages accreditation schemes. EnterpriseSG also manages the Good Laboratory Practice (GLP) Compliance Program, which assesses whether facilities and laboratory studies meet international standards.

=== Support for businesses ===
EnterpriseSG administers a range of programs that provide financial and technical support to enterprises.

- The Start-Up SG program partners with incubators, angel investors, and other government agencies.
- For small- and medium-sized enterprises, the agency provides grants, access to research institutes and technology, and international expansion support through tax incentives and funding schemes.
- It also provides programmes such as PACT that facilitate joint projects between larger and smaller companies.

== Internationalization efforts ==
=== Overseas markets ===
EnterpriseSG has overseas centres in various countries to support the internationalisation of Singaporean enterprises. In total, there are over 30 overseas centres in 21 countries, including nine in the People's Republic of China.

=== Plug and Play Network ===
Launched in 2018, the agency established a Plug and Play Network in partnership with nine organizations in six countries.

The Plug and Play Network includes market research, a database for overseas partners, and facilities intended to assist companies with connections and workspace arrangements.

=== Bilateral business forums ===
EnterpriseSG organises business forums for delegates and officials from Singapore and other countries to discuss business partnerships. Participants include India, Latin America, Bangladesh, Germany, among other countries, including in Africa with the ASBF.

== See also ==
- Economy of Singapore
