= SPRING Singapore =

Former Singaporean agency for enterprise development

Agency overview
- Formed: 1 April 1996; 30 years ago (as Productivity and Standards Board); April 2002; 24 years ago (as SPRING Singapore)
- Preceding agencies: National Productivity Board; Singapore Institute of Standards and Industrial Research
- Dissolved: 1 April 2018; 8 years ago
- Superseding agency: Enterprise Singapore
- Jurisdiction: Government of Singapore
- Headquarters: 1 Fusionopolis Walk, #01-02 South Tower, Solaris Singapore 138628
- Agency executives: Philip Yeo, Chairman; Poon Hong Yuen, Chief Executive
- Parent agency: Ministry of Trade and Industry (Singapore)
- Agency ID: T08GB0061D

The Standards, Productivity and Innovation Board (abbreviation: SPRING Singapore) was a statutory board under the Ministry of Trade and Industry of the Singapore Government. It worked as an agency for enterprise development, and helped enterprises enhance their competitiveness in the Singapore market. It was also the national standards and conformance body.

On April 1, 2018, SPRING Singapore was merged with IE Singapore to form Enterprise Singapore.

== History ==
Formerly known as Productivity and Standards Board (PSB), it was formed from the merger between the National Productivity Board (NPB) and the Singapore Institute of Standards and Industrial Research (SISIR) in April 1996. It helped to bring together the soft skills of productivity handled by NPB and the technical aspects handled by SISIR.

In April 2002, the organization was renamed SPRING Singapore and shifted towards an innovation-driven economy, and its new role in promoting creativity to sustain growth for Singaporeans.

== Mission ==
As the national standards and conformance body, SPRING Singapore 'helped to lower technical barriers to trade, provide quality assurance for products and services and promote industry use of Singapore and international standards'.

SPRING Singapore's mission was "to help Singapore enterprises grow and build trust in Singapore products and services".

== Organisation ==
SPRING Singapore was headed by Philip Yeo, former head of A*STAR.

SPRING Singapore was divided into five departments:

- Enterprise Capabilities
- Enterprise Promotion
- Industry Development
- Quality & Standards
- Corporate Development

== Portfolio ==
The agency had three areas of focus: productivity and innovation; standards and quality; and Small and medium-sized enterprises (SMEs) and the domestic sector.

== Scholarships ==
In 2008, SPRING Singapore awarded their first batch of Executive Development Scholarships (EDS) to focused junior college and university students with business and entrepreneurship goals.

The Management Development Scholarship (MDS) was also available to employees of SMEs who wish to pursue their Masters with a university on SPRING Singapore's list. Up to 90% of the course fees was subsidised by SPRING Singapore, with the remaining 10% fully borne by the SME company. This scholarship came with a bond of up to two years with the sponsoring SME company.

== See also ==
- Ministry of Trade and Industry
- Government of Singapore
- Economy of Singapore
