= Organisation of the Government of Singapore =

The Government of Singapore consists of several departments, known as ministries and statutory boards in Singapore. Ministries are led by a member of the Cabinet and deal with state matters that require direct political oversight. The member of the Cabinet heading the ministry is known as the minister, who is supported by a junior minister known as minister of state in Singapore. The administrative management of the ministry is led by a senior civil servant known as permanent secretary.

== Organisations ==
=== Prime Minister's Office (PMO) ===
==== Committees/Councils ====
- Singapore Bicentennial Office

==== Departments/Divisions ====
- Communications Group
- Corrupt Practices Investigation Bureau
- Cyber Security Agency (Co managed by MDDI)
- Elections Department
- Horticultural Section
- Istana Maintenance Unit
- Istana Security Unit
- Justices of the Peace, Singapore
- National Research Foundation
- National Security Coordination Secretariat
- Public Service Division
- Smart Nation and Digital Government Office
- Strategy Group
  - National Climate Change Secretariat (NCCS)
  - National Population and Talent Division (NPTD)
- Public Sector Science and Technology Policy and Plans Office

==== Statutory Boards ====
- Civil Service College Singapore
- Government Technology Agency (Co managed by MDDI)
- Monetary Authority of Singapore

=== Ministry of Culture, Community and Youth (MCCY) ===
==== Committees/Councils ====
- Hindu Advisory Board
- Hindu Endowments Board
- National Integration Council
- Sikh Advisory Board

==== Departments/Divisions ====
- Arts and Heritage Division
- Charities Unit
- Community Relations and Engagement Division
- Corporate Communications Division
- Development and Corporate Administration Division
- Human Resource and Organisation Development
- Information Technology Division
- Internal Audit Division
- Legal Unit
- National Youth Council
- Registry of Co-operative Societies and Mutual Benefit Organisations
- Resilience and Engagement Division
- Partnerships Project Office
- Sports Division
- Strategic Planning and Finance Division
- Youth Division

==== Statutory boards ====
- Majlis Ugama Islam Singapura
- National Arts Council
- National Heritage Board
- People's Association
- Sport Singapore

=== Ministry of Digital Development and Information (MDDI) ===
==== Departments/Divisions ====
- Audit Unit
- Corporate Communications Division
- Corporate Development Division
- Cyber Security Agency (under PMO)
- Digital Readiness & Learning Division
- Economic Regulation Division
- Group Information Technology Division
- Industry Division
- Information Operations Centre
- Information Planning Office
- Information Policy Division
- Legal Services
- Media Division
- Public Communications Division
- REACH
- Research & Data Division
- Security & Resilience Division
- Senior Consultants
- Strategic Planning Division
- Transformation

==== Statutory boards ====
- Infocomm Media Development Authority
- National Library Board
  - National Archives of Singapore
- Personal Data Protection Commission

=== Ministry of Defence (MINDEF) ===
==== Departments/Divisions ====
- Centre for Strategic Infocomm Technologies
- Defence Management Group
- Defence Policy Group
- Defence Technology Collaboration Office
- Defence Cyber Organisation
- Future Systems and Technology Directorate
- Industry & Resources Policy Office
- Internal Audit Department
- MINDEF Tele-Services
- MINDEF/SAF Manpower Centres
- SAF Formations
  - Singapore Army
  - Republic of Singapore Navy (RSN)
  - Republic of Singapore Air Force (RSAF)
  - Digital and Intelligence Service (DIS)
  - SAF Military Police Command
  - Army Senior Specialist Staff Officers
  - Centre of Excellence for Soldier Performance
  - SAF Sports Association (SAFSA)
- Singapore Armed Forces
  - The Joint Staff
  - Foreign Military Liaison Branch
  - Headquarters Medical Corps
  - Army Headquarters
  - Navy Headquarters
  - Air Force Headquarters
  - Digital and Intelligence Service Headquarters
  - SAFTI Military Institute Headquarters
- Singapore Maritime Crisis Centre
- Safety and Systems Review Directorate
- Security and Intelligence Division (SID)
- Technology Strategy and Policy Office
- Military Security Department
- Training Schools
  - Basic Military Training Centre (BMTC)
  - Officer Cadet School (OCS)
  - Specialist Cadet School (SCS)
  - Specialist and Warrant Officer Advanced School

==== Statutory board ====
- Defence Science and Technology Agency (DSTA)

=== Ministry of Education (MOE) ===
==== Departments/Divisions ====
- Communications and Engagement Group
- HR Group
- Academy of Singapore Teachers
- Curriculum Planning & Development Division 1
- Curriculum Planning & Development Division 2
- Educational Technology Division
- Finance and Procurement Division
- Higher Education Group
- Infrastructure and Facility Services
- Information Technology Division
- Planning Division
- Research and Management Information Division
- Schools Division
- Special Education Needs Division
- Student Placement and Services Division
- Student Development Curriculum Division
- Curriculum Policy Office
- English Language Institute of Singapore
- Internal Audit
- Legal Services
- Physical Education and Sports Teacher Academy
- Singapore Teachers Academy for the Arts

==== Universities ====
- National University of Singapore
- Nanyang Technological University
- Singapore Institute of Technology
- Singapore Management University
- Singapore University of Social Sciences
- Singapore University of Technology and Design

==== Statutory boards ====
- Institute of Technical Education
- ISEAS–Yusof Ishak Institute
- Nanyang Polytechnic
- Ngee Ann Polytechnic
- Republic Polytechnic
- Science Centre Singapore
- Singapore Examinations and Assessment Board
- Singapore Polytechnic
- Temasek Polytechnic

=== Ministry of Finance (MOF) ===
==== Departments/Divisions ====
- Accountant-General's Department
- Corporate Development
- Corporate Services Directorate
- Economic Programmes Directorate
- Fiscal Policy Directorate
- Free Trade Agreement
- Goods and Services Tax Board of Review
- Governance and Investment Directorate
- Income Tax Board of Review
- Internal Audit Unit
- Managing for Excellence Directorate
- Singapore Customs
- Social and Security Programmes
- Street and Building Names Board
- Valuation Review Board
- Vital.org

==== Statutory boards ====
- Accounting and Corporate Regulatory Authority
- Inland Revenue Authority of Singapore (IRAS)
- Singapore Accountancy Commission (SAC)
- Singapore Totalisator Board (Tote Board)

=== Ministry of Foreign Affairs (MFA) ===
==== Directorates in Headquarters ====
- Americas Directorate
- ASEAN Directorate
- Australia, New Zealand and the Pacific Directorate
- Consular Directorate
- Corporate Affairs Directorate
- Europe Directorate
- Human Resource Directorate
- MFA Diplomatic Academy
- Information Management Directorate
- Internal Audit Unit
- International Economics Directorate
- International Organisations Directorate
- Middle East, North Africa and Central Asia Directorate
- Northeast Asia Directorate
- Protocol Directorate
- South Asia and Sub-Saharan Africa Directorate
- Southeast Asia I Directorate
- Southeast Asia II Directorate
- Strategic Communications Directorate
- Technical Cooperation Directorate

=== Ministry of Health (MOH) ===
==== Committees/Councils ====
- Dental Specialist Accreditation Board
- Family Physicians Accreditation Board
- Optometrists and Opticians Board
- Pharmacy Specialist Accreditation Board
- Specialist Accreditation Board
- Allied Health Professions Council

==== Departments/Divisions ====
- Agency for Integrated Care
- Alexandra Hospital
- Changi General Hospital
- Institute of Mental Health
- KK Women's and Children's Hospital
- Khoo Teck Puat Hospital
- MOH Office for Healthcare Transformation
- National Cancer Centre Singapore
- National Centre for Infectious Diseases
- National Dental Centre Singapore
- National Healthcare Group
- National Healthcare Group Polyclinics
- National Heart Centre Singapore
- National Neuroscience Institute
- National Skin Centre
- National University Health System
- National University Hospital
- National University Polyclinics
- Ng Teng Fong General Hospital
- Sengkang General Hospital
- Singapore Gamma Knife Centre
- Singapore General Hospital
- Singapore Health Services
- Singapore National Eye Centre
- SingHealth Polyclinics
- Tan Tock Seng Hospital
- Woodlands Health Campus

==== Statutory boards ====
- Communicable Diseases Agency
- Health Promotion Board
- Health Sciences Authority
- Singapore Dental Council
- Singapore Medical Council
- Singapore Nursing Board
- Singapore Pharmacy Council
- TCM Practitioners Board

=== Ministry of Home Affairs (MHA) ===
==== Councils ====
- National Council Against Drug Abuse
- National Crime Prevention Council
- National Fire Prevention and Civil Emergency Preparedness Council
- Presidential Council for Religious Harmony

==== Departments ====
- Central Narcotics Bureau
- Home Team Academy
- Immigration and Checkpoints Authority
- Internal Security Department
- Singapore Civil Defence Force
- Singapore Police Force
- Singapore Prison Service

==== Divisions ====
- Community Partnership & Communications Group
- Finance & Admin Division
- Gambling Regulatory Unit
- Human Resource Division
- Home Team Medical Services Division
- International Cooperation and Partnerships Division
- Legal Division
- Joint Operations Group
- Science & Technology Group
- Planning & Organisation Division
- Policy Development Division
- Technology and Logistics Division
- Registry of Societies
- Research & Statistics Division
- Risk Management and Audit Group
- Training and Competency Development Division
- Office of Chief Psychologist

==== Statutory boards ====
- Gambling Regulatory Authority of Singapore (GRA)
- Home Team Science and Technology Agency (HTX)
- Yellow Ribbon Singapore

=== Ministry of Law (MinLaw) ===
==== Committees/Councils ====
- Singapore Academy of Law (SAL)

==== Departments/Divisions ====
- Appeals Board (Land Acquisition)
- Community Legal Services Group
- Copyright Tribunals
- Corporate Services Divisions
- International & Advisory
- Legal Policy
- Legal Services Regulatory Authority
- Policy Divisions

==== Statutory boards ====
- Intellectual Property Office of Singapore (IPOS)
- Singapore Land Authority (SLA)
- Land Surveyors Board (LSB)

=== Ministry of Manpower (MOM) ===
==== Departments/Divisions ====
- Assurance, Care and Engagement Group
- Corporate Services Group
- Economics Department
- Foreign Manpower Management Division
- Income Security Policy Department
- Joint Operations Division
- Labour Relations and Workplaces Division
- Legal Services Division
- Manpower Planning and Policy Division
- Manpower Research and Statistics Department
- Occupational Safety and Health Division
- Work Pass Division
- Workplace Policy and Strategy Division

==== Statutory boards ====
- Central Provident Fund Board
- Singapore Labour Foundation
- Skills and Workforce Development Agency (Co managed by MOE)

=== Ministry of National Development (MND) ===
==== Committees ====
- Community Improvement Projects Committee
- Community Improvement Projects Executive Committee

==== Councils ====
- Aljunied–Hougang Town Council
- Ang Mo Kio Town Council
- Bishan–Toa Payoh Town Council
- Chua Chu Kang Town Council
- East Coast Town Council
- Holland–Bukit Panjang Town Council
- Jalan Besar Town Council
- Jalan Kayu Town Council
- Jurong–Clementi-Bukit Batok Town Council
- Marine Parade-Bradell Heights Town Council
- Marsiling–Yew Tee Town Council
- Nee Soon Town Council
- Pasir Ris–Changi Town Council
- Punggol Town Council
- Sembawang Town Council
- Sengkang Town Council
- Tampines Town Council
- Tanjong Pagar Town Council
- West Coast-Jurong West Town Council

==== Departments/Divisions ====
- Corporate Development Division
- Housing Division
- Infrastructure Division
- Planning and Research Unit
- Strategic Planning Division

==== Statutory boards ====
- Board of Architects
- Building and Construction Authority (BCA)
- Council for Estate Agencies (CEA)
- Housing and Development Board (HDB)
- National Parks Board (NParks)
- Professional Engineers Board, Singapore
- Strata Titles Boards
- Urban Redevelopment Authority (URA)

=== Ministry of Social and Family Development (MSF) ===
==== Departments ====
- Early Childhood Development Agency
- Emergency Preparedness Unit
- Feedback Unit
- Organisational Development Unit

==== Divisions ====
- Communications and International Relations Division
- Community and Social Sector Development Division
- Elderly Development Division
- Family Development Division
- Finance And Facilities Division
- Human Resource Division
- Information Technology Division
- Rehabilitation & Protection Division
- Social Support Division
- Sports Division
- Strategic Policy And Research Division
- Youth Division

==== Statutory boards ====
- National Council of Social Service

=== Ministry of Sustainability and the Environment (MSE) ===
==== Departments/Divisions ====
- Energy & Climate Policy
- Environmental Policy
- Water & Food Policy
- International Policy
- Communications & 3P Partnerships Division
- Futures & Planning
- Corporate Development
- Climate Change Negotiation Office

==== Statutory boards ====
- National Environment Agency (NEA)
- Public Utilities Board (PUB)
- Singapore Food Agency (SFA)

=== Ministry of Energy, Trade and Industry (METI) ===
==== Departments/Divisions ====
- Capability Development Group
- Corporate Development Division
- Department of Statistics (DOS)
- Directorate A, Trade Division
- Directorate B, Trade Division
- Economics Division
- Enterprise Division
- Industry Division
- International Business Development Division
- Resource Centre
- Resource Division
- Service Improvement Unit
- Special Project Unit

==== Statutory boards ====
- Agency for Science, Technology and Research (A*STAR)
- Competition and Consumer Commission of Singapore (CCCS)
- Economic Development Board (EDB)
  - DesignSingapore Council
- Energy Market Authority (EMA)
- Enterprise Singapore (ESG)
- Hotels Licensing Board (HLB)
- JTC Corporation (JTC)
- Sentosa Development Corporation (SDC)
- Singapore Tourism Board (STB)

=== Ministry of Transport (MOT) ===
==== Departments/Divisions ====
- Air Transport Division
- Corporate Communications Division
- Corporate Development Division
- Futures and Transformation Division
- International Relations and Security Division
- Land Transport Division
- Sea Transport Division
- Transport Safety Investigation Bureau
- Technology Office

==== Statutory boards ====
- Civil Aviation Authority of Singapore (CAAS)
- Land Transport Authority (LTA)
- Maritime and Port Authority of Singapore (MPA)
- Public Transport Council (PTC)

== Organs of State ==
- Attorney-General's Chambers (AGC)
- Auditor-General's Office (AGO)
- Cabinet of Singapore
- The Istana
- Judiciary, Industrial Arbitration Court (IAC)
- Judiciary, Family Justice Courts
- Judiciary, State Courts
- Judiciary, Supreme Court
- Parliament of Singapore
- Public Service Commission (PSC)

== See also ==
- Statutory boards of the Government of Singapore
