= List of hospitals in Singapore =

The following is a list of hospitals in Singapore registered with the Ministry of Health.

== Acute hospitals ==
Name	Opened	District	Ownership	Beds	Staff
Changi General Hospital	1998	Simei	Public (SingHealth)	1,132	7,092
KK Women's and Children's Hospital	1858	Rochor	Public (SingHealth)	864	5,411
Sengkang General Hospital	2018	Sengkang	Public (SingHealth)	920	5,404
Singapore General Hospital	1821	Outram	Public (SingHealth)	1,931	10,725
Khoo Teck Puat Hospital	2010	Yishun	Public (National Healthcare Group)	795	
Tan Tock Seng Hospital	1844	Novena	Public (National Healthcare Group)	1,700	
Woodlands Hospital	2023	Woodlands	Public (National Healthcare Group)	1,800	
Alexandra Hospital	1938	Queenstown	Public (National University Health System)	326	
National University Hospital	1985	Kent Ridge	Public (National University Health System)	1,700	>10,700
Ng Teng Fong General Hospital	2015	Jurong East	Public (National University Health System)	700	
Mount Alvernia Hospital	1961	Marymount	Not-for-Profit	319	
Crawfurd Hospital	2012	Bukit Timah	Private	31	
Farrer Park Hospital	2016	Farrer Park	Private	121	
Gleneagles Hospital	1957	Tanglin	Private (Parkway Pantai)	257	
Mount Elizabeth Hospital	1979	Orchard	Private (Parkway Pantai)	345	
Mount Elizabeth Novena Hospital	2012	Novena	Private (Parkway Pantai)	333	
Parkway East Hospital	1942	Joo Chiat	Private (Parkway Pantai)	143	
Raffles Hospital	2002	Bugis	Private (Raffles Medical Group)	380	
Thomson Medical Centre	1979	Thomson	Private (Thomson Medical Group)	187	

== Cancer treatment centres ==
Cancer treatment centres in Singapore are generally located in both public and private hospitals. These units and medical centres specialise in the treatment of cancer (oncology):

- Farrer Park Hospital
- Raffles Hospital
- Parkway East Hospital - Parkway Cancer Centre
- Gleneagles Hospital - Parkway Cancer Centre
- Tan Tock Seng Hospital
- Singapore General Hospital
- KK Women's and Children's Hospital
- Mount Elizabeth Hospital - Parkway Cancer Centre
- National Cancer Centre
- National University Hospital
- Changi General Hospital

== Community hospitals ==
Name	Opened	District	Ownership	Beds	Staff
Outram Community Hospital	2019	Bukit Merah	Public (SingHealth)	382	724
Sengkang Community Hospital	2018	Sengkang	Public (SingHealth)	400	575
Woodlands Hospital	2023	Woodlands	Public (National Healthcare Group)		
Yishun Community Hospital	2015	Yishun	Public (National Healthcare Group)	224	
Jurong Community Hospital	2015	Jurong East	Public (National University Health System)	400	
Ang Mo Kio - Thye Hua Kwan Hospital	1993	Ang Mo Kio	Not-for-Profit	360	
Ren Ci Community Hospital	1994	Novena	Not-for-Profit		
St. Andrew's Community Hospital	1992	Simei	Not-for-Profit	277	
St Luke's Hospital	1996	Bukit Batok	Not-for-Profit		588

== Psychiatric hospital ==
Name	Opened	District	Ownership	Beds	Staff
Institute of Mental Health	1841	Hougang	Public (National Healthcare Group)	2,010	

== Upcoming hospitals ==
- Eastern General Hospital (EGH) and Eastern Community Hospital (ECH) in Bedok, which collectively forms the EGH Campus. Will be operated by SingHealth and have about 1,400 beds.
- Tengah General and Community Hospital (TGCH) in Tengah, to be operated by the National University Health System (NUHS).

== Defunct hospitals ==
- Bright Vision Community Hospital: To be converted to a psychiatric nursing home in 2024.
- British Military Hospital: Predecessor of Alexandra Hospital
- Changi Hospital: Merged with Toa Payoh Hospital to form Changi General Hospital on 15 February 1997.
- Toa Payoh Hospital: Merged with Changi Hospital to form Changi General Hospital on 15 February 1997.
- View Road Hospital: Used to be a subsidiary of Institute of Mental Health (Singapore), but ceased operations in 2001.

== See also ==
- Assisi Hospice
- Camden Medical Centre
- National Centre for Infectious Diseases
- Singapore Cord Blood Bank
- Singapore Gamma Knife Centre
- Singapore National Eye Centre
- Fullerton Health Group
