= Eastern General Hospital (Singapore) =

Hospital in Singapore

- SingHealth

Geography
- Location: Bedok North, Singapore
- Coordinates: 1.337052°N 103.915292°E

Organisation
- Type: District General

Services
- Emergency department: Yes
- Beds: 1,400

Links
- Website: www.egh.com.sg

Eastern General Hospital (EGH) is a future public general hospital in Bedok North, Singapore. Managed by SingHealth, the hospital is developed to serve the growing healthcare needs of residents in eastern Singapore.

When operational, EGH will form part of an integrated healthcare campus (EGH Campus) alongside Eastern Community Hospital.

== History ==
In 2020, the Ministry of Health (MOH) announced plans to build a new public general hospital in the eastern part of Singapore to complement the existing Changi General Hospital (CGH). The site chosen was a plot bounded by Bedok North Road and Bedok Reservoir Road.

The groundbreaking ceremony was held on 20 April 2024, and the construction is planned to be completed by 2030.
