= Ang Mo Kio - Thye Hua Kwan Hospital =

Community hospital in Ang Mo Kio, Singapore

- Thye Hua Kwan Moral Society

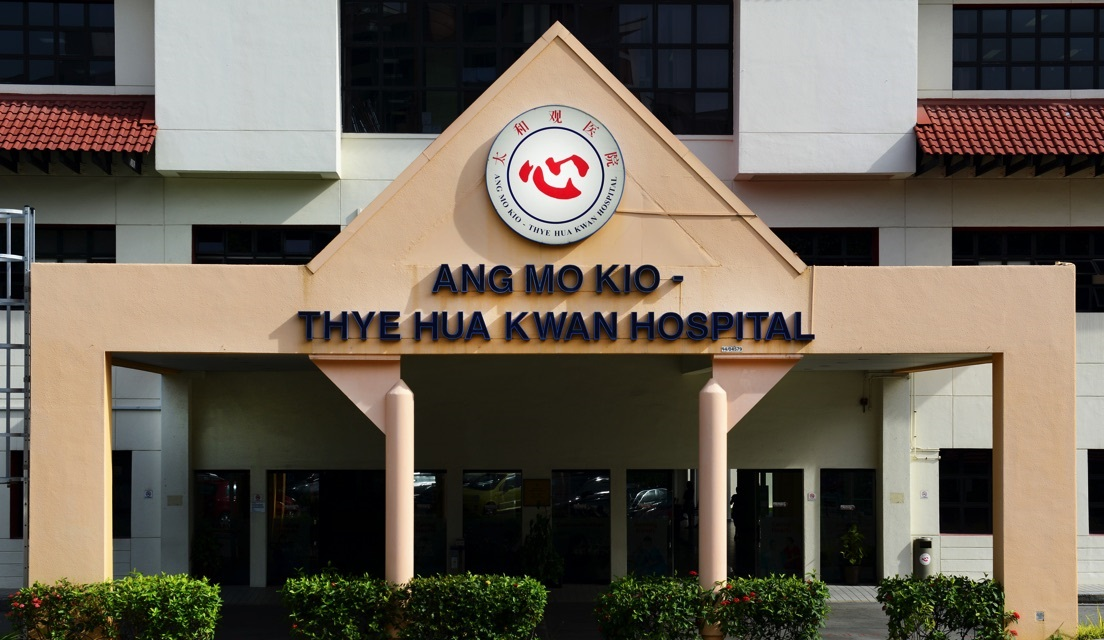
- Ang Mo Kio - Thye Hua Kwan Hospital facade

Geography
- Location: 17 Ang Mo Kio Avenue 9, Singapore 569766, Singapore

Organisation
- Type: Community hospital

Services
- Beds: 370

Links
- Website: www.amkh.org.sg
- Lists: Hospitals in Singapore

Ang Mo Kio – Thye Hua Kwan Hospital (AMK-THKH) is a 370-bed community hospital in Ang Mo Kio, Singapore. Ward visiting hours are from 12pm to 8pm daily. As a community hospital, care is primarily focused on providing rehabilitative and sub-acute care for geriatric patients. Admission is via referral. AMK-THKH does not have an emergency department.

The hospital, originally named Ang Mo Kio Community Hospital, was opened in June 1993. On 1 April 2002, the hospital, then managed by SingHealth, was transferred to Thye Hua Kwan Moral Society.

== Services ==
Inpatient	Outpatient
Rehabilitation	Day Rehabilitation Centre
Sub-acute Care	Home Healthcare Services, including Home Medical, Nursing and Therapy
Convalescent Care	ACTION Programme
Caregiver Training	
Dementia Care	

== Ancillary ==
- Healing Hub (Pharmacy)
- Dialysis Centre (outpatient)
- Day Rehabilitation Centre (outpatient)

== Milestones ==
1993: Government established AMK Community Hospital

2002: Thye Hua Kwan Moral Society (THKMS) took over the Hospital from SingHealth

2003: First private hospital to put up isolation wards for patients recovering from SARS

2012: Partnership with THK to provide TCM Services Increase capacity by 51 beds to 251

2013: Partnership with B Braun Opening of Healing Hub

2014: Opening of new South Wing – Increasing bed capacity by 110 beds to 370
