= Bright Vision Community Hospital =

Hospital in Hougang, Singapore

- SingHealth

Geography
- Location: 5 Lorong Napiri, Singapore 547530, Singapore
- Coordinates: 1.372311°N 103.878017°E

Organisation
- Type: Community hospital

Services
- Emergency department: No Accident & Emergency
- Beds: 318

History
- Former name: Bright Vision Hospital (2001–2023)
- Opened: 2001
- Closed: 2024

Links
- Lists: Hospitals in Singapore

Bright Vision Community Hospital (BVCH) was a 318-bedded public community hospital at 5 Lorong Napiri, Singapore 547530, off Yio Chu Kang Road, in Hougang, Singapore. It was founded by the Singapore Buddhist Welfare Services in 2001, who gave ownership of the hospital to SingHealth in 2011 owing to management challenges.

BVCH changed its name from Bright Vision Hospital to Bright Vision Community Hospital in January 2023 and has been used as a COVID-19 Treatment Facility since 11 April 2022, serving both COVID-19 patients and community hospital patients.

In 2024, Bright Vision Community Hospital was closed and slated to be converted into a psychiatric nursing home.
