= Mount Alvernia Hospital =

Hospital in Singapore

Coordinates: 1.3418401°N 103.8376666°E

Geography
- Location: 820 Thomson Road, Singapore 574623, Singapore

Organisation
- Type: General
- Religious affiliation: Catholic

Services
- Beds: 378

History
- Founded: 4 March 1961; 65 years ago

Links
- Website: mtalvernia.sg
- Lists: Hospitals in Singapore

Mount Alvernia Hospital is the only not-for-profit general acute tertiary care private hospital in Singapore. With close to 380 beds, Alvernia is supported by more than 300 on-campus specialist doctors and nearly 1,400 accredited doctors.

== History ==
In 1949, Sisters from the Franciscan Missionaries of the Divine Motherhood (FMDM) took over the tuberculosis wards at Tan Tock Seng Hospital, which eventually became known as Mandalay Road Hospital. They also served “The Lepers Camp”, a community of lepers housed in Trafalgar Home in Woodbridge Hospital (now IMH). Both centres were managed as self-contained units as isolation was the treatment at that time.

In 1952, the Sisters were given an opportunity to start a private hospital to bring nursing care and services to the population. It was to be a well-planned and professionally managed hospital for everyone; especially for the poor and the disadvantaged. The FMDM Sisters pooled their savings and salaries, and canvassed for donations all over Singapore. The Colonial government at that time promised a dollar-for-dollar matching grant based on the total collection.

The Sisters bought land on Thomson Hill in October 1956, which was cleared in 1957. However, the construction of the hospital, which was meant to have begun in 1956, was delayed after the government announced that it would not subsidise the cost. Minister of Health A. J. Braga performed the ground breaking ceremony on 7 January 1959. Construction of the building began later that year, as the government had promised the Sisters a grant of $425,000.

After Singapore gained self-government and the 1959 Singaporean general election, the matching grant from the colonial government was cancelled. The Sisters had to adjust their plans to cater for a 60-bed hospital instead of 200 but would be fully equipped to provide medical, surgical and maternity care.

On 4 March 1961, Mount Alvernia Hospital was declared officially opened. Staffing was done entirely by the Sisters who were professionally trained as nurses, midwives, physiotherapists, radiographers, laboratory technicians and other support services. The Sisters who ran the hospital received all their professional healthcare qualifications, religious training and work attachment at a hospital in the United Kingdom.

At the time of opening, the hospital was equipped with two operating theatres, an anaesthetics room, a recovery room, two labour wards, a nursery and a milk kitchen. A physiotherapy department was also in place, as well as one outpatient department and a dispensary. X ray department was set up immediately. The nursing Sisters performed ward duties from 7am to 9pm and doubled up as housekeepers, chefs and meal servers when they are off ward duties.

In 1963, the first extension to MAH was completed. This provided improved outpatient facilities, a new delivery suite, a third labour ward, a specialised nursery for premature infants and two more operating theatres. In the same year, the first Resident Medical Officer (RMO) joined the team and a second RMO was added two years later.

In 1964, one of the Sisters came back after her training in England and Ireland to set up a department of pathology, a blood bank, making MAH the first hospital to have its own blood bank and it was 90% self-sufficient. Patients' relatives were encouraged to donate. With the seaport bustling with activities at that time, the Sisters also regularly went out to the anchored ships to drive blood donation from visiting seamen.

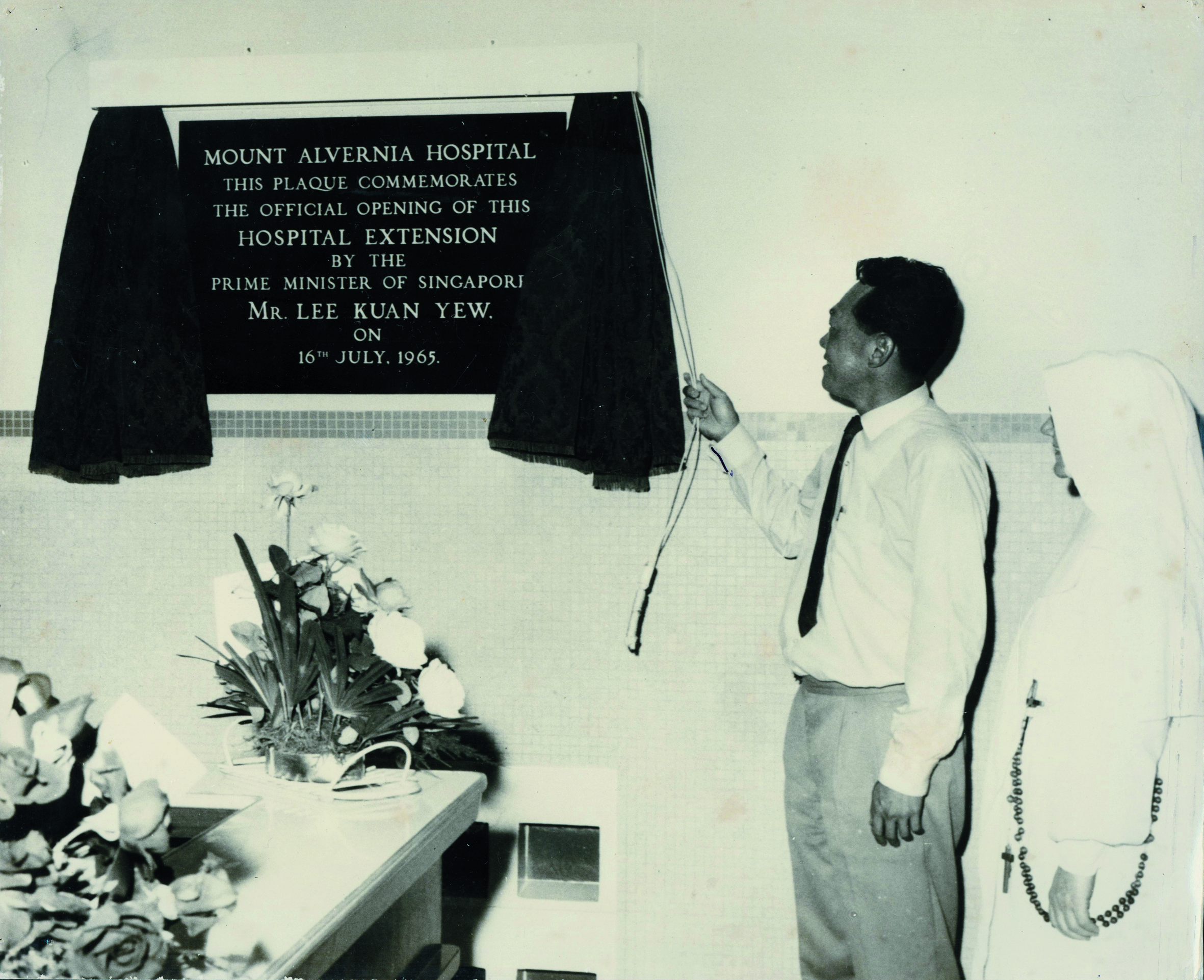
The late Mr Lee Kuan Yew opened the new hospital wing

During the early years after independence, government focus on expanding medical services in primary healthcare was to improve hygiene. Inpatient care was not high on the list of government priorities at that time. MAH saw the need to further develop to increase inpatient capacity and support services.

In July 1965, Prime Minister Lee Kuan Yew officially opened a new 5-storey wing, which brought the total number of beds to 127.

In 1969, MAH added another extension to provide care to chronically ill patients. Within this building, another 22 beds were added.

Lee returned to the hospital again in 1971 to open another wing adding another 72 beds to the capacity. With this addition, the hospital now had 221 beds.

The new wing included an Intensive Care Unit and a Paediatric Ward. It also housed a new outpatient department with consulting rooms and a minor theatre. A radiography department, pathology laboratory were expanded, a hydrotherapy pool was added to the physiotherapy department. For the convenience of the patients and visitors, the public areas boasted a new coffee house and a pharmacy.

In the 1980s, a decision was taken to accommodate some specialist clinics on campus. Work began in 1989 to build a new 7-storey medical centre. With doctors on-campus, increased in patient loads were expected. 1991 saw the construction of a new wing to accommodate medical and consulting suites. This wing would also include a suite of six operating theatres, a delivery suite of 10 rooms and 4-bedded first-stage room, a new physiotherapy and occupational therapy unit.

MAH further stepped up support for specialist practices by expanding clinical services from the late 1990s onwards. These include X ray, MRI, multi slide CT-scan and digital mammography. Other developments include capabilities for laparoscope of Minimal Access Surgery. A Lithotripter Centre was opened and a bone densitometer was added to the facilities of Diagnostic Imaging Department. Clinical support staff received training and skills upgrading with attachments at leading international institutions.

In addition to training its own staff, the hospital also ran courses for doctors. MAH scored a first as a private healthcare initiative by beaming the procedure live from the operating theatre to be viewed in a separate training area. Foreign doctors were included in the training. The capability for laparoscopic surgery allowed MAH to include many more procedures in its Day Surgery services.

In 1986, MAH started accepting respite patients. This extension became known as Assisi Home. Two years later, it expanded into the area of Hospice Care and in 1992, a decision was taken to establish hospice care as a dedicated mission of the Assisi Hospice, housed in a separate building from the hospital.

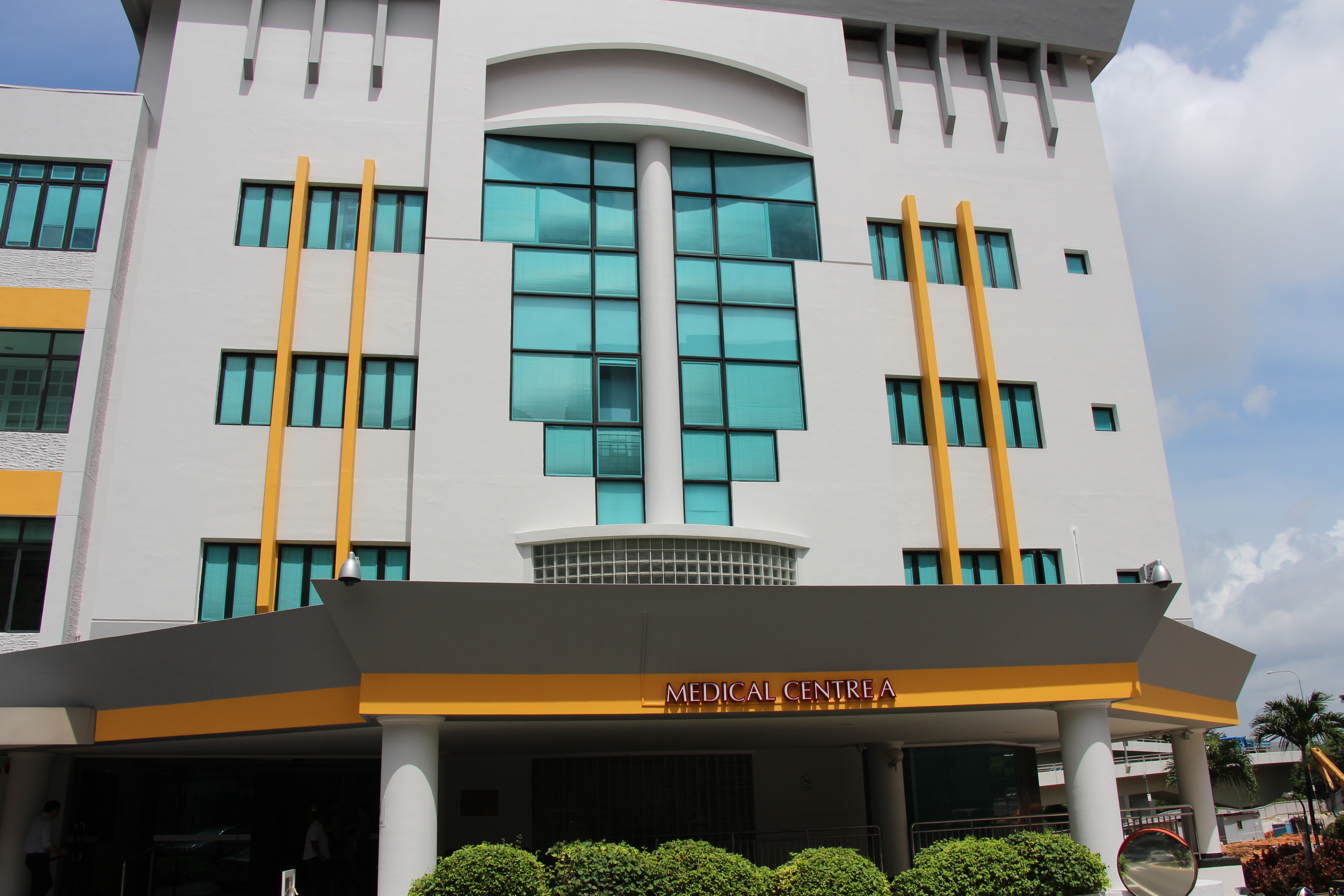
Medical Centre A was officially opened in 1996

In 1996, the new medical centre (now known as Medical Centre A) was finally opened and started admitting specialist doctors with full admission rights.

Health screening centre was added to offer comprehensive and personalized services. The other service was the Day Surgery where the patient could register, checkout and collect medication in one place.

In 2004, allied health services were stepped up with the setting up of the Sports Medicine and Sports Surgery Centre functions in tandem with the rehabilitation centre. The following year, MAH added 24-hour outpatient clinic services to fill the gap when extended hours in Singapore public sector polyclinics were discontinued

In October 2010, MAH opened the Alvernia Parentcraft Centre for ante-natal care, childbirth education and newborn baby care.

The following year saw more investment in several IT initiatives such as electronic medical records, online medical test order by doctors, enhancement of pharmacy information system and customer relationship management system.

The new side extension facing Thomson Road was completed in 2012. It housed additional diagnostic imaging facilities, a bigger health screening centre, more operating theatres and patient beds. It is served by a covered pedestrian walkway to provide access to Thomson Road.

The hospital Chapel had been an integral part of the infrastructure since MAH started in 1961. The Chapel went through a renovation and reopened in 2013. The new medical centre D was finally completed and officially opened by Minister of Health, Gan Kim Yong in October 2014. This new 17,490sq m new facility not only provides additional medical suites, but also expanded car park space for the hospital. It houses over 60 specialist clinics and cover 28 specialties.

== Community Outreach ==
Since 2009, the hospital-wide Community Outreach programme has reached out to more than 15,000 people through mass health screenings and health talks conducted at the grassroots level through channels such as the People's Association, churches and other religious organisations. A new channel for partnership was established when MAH and the Singapore Heart Foundation signed a Memorandum of Understanding on 28 August 2012 to explore joint activities to promote heart health.

Since 2013, MAH were able to bring free health screening to other religious organizations. They are Lembaga Pentadbir Masjid Ar-Raudhah mosque located at Bukit Batok and Sree Ramar Temple located at Changi Village. Several outreach activities were extended to overseas community organizations in Indonesia and Vietnam through charity events and free health screenings.

== See also ==
- List of hospitals in Singapore
