= View Road Hospital =

Hospital in Singapore

- Subsidiary of the Institute of Mental Health

Geography
- Location: 10 View Road, Woodlands, Singapore, 757918, Singapore
- Coordinates: 1.452008°N 103.789781°E (approximate)

Organisation
- Type: Specialist

Services
- Beds: 294
- Speciality: Psychiatry

History
- Opened: 1 August 1975; 51 years ago
- Closed: 2001; 25 years ago

Links
- Lists: Hospitals in Singapore

View Road Hospital was a hospital in Woodlands, Singapore. It was used as a branch of Woodbridge Hospital (now the Institute of Mental Health) used for occupational therapy for long term schizophrenia patients until it was closed in 2001. It had been used on two occasions as a foreign workers dormitory known as View Road Lodge on two occasions from 2008 to 2017. It is now unoccupied.

== History ==
Located in the former Naval Base in Sembawang and Woodlands, the building was constructed as 'Rimau Offices and Accommodation'. It was possibly completed in late 1941 as photographic records from the British National Archives that are also held by the National Archives of Singapore seem to show.

Unique features of the E-shaped three-storey building and its site are a watch tower and an above-ground bomb-proof office at the building's rear. There are suggestions that the main building may have been completed during the Japanese Occupation (1942 to 1945). However, a Japanese photograph taken from Johor Bahru that is held by the United States National Archives appears to show the building with its watch tower. Not much is known of its use during the Japanese Occupation, although wartime artefacts have been discovered at the site. Intelligence reports published in 1944 identify the building as a "large administration building". Three unoccupied light anti-aircraft gun emplacements in its vicinity are also mentioned in the report - an indication that the site was used as part of the anti-aircraft defences along the western perimeter of the Naval Base.

Following the war, there was a proposal by the Royal Air Force (RAF) to convert the building into a Maritime HQ (a command centre for joint maritime air operations). The plans fell through due to signal interference from the nearby SUARA broadcasting Station. In 1959, the building was converted into the 'Naval Base Police Asian Quarters' - to house Asian naval base policemen and their families. A Sikh temple, the Gurdwara Sabha Naval Police, was also set up on its grounds (Sikh Punjabis made up a large proportion of the force's ranks). The arrangement lasted until the British military withdrawal in October 1971, when the force was disbanded. Families were however permitted to stay on until early 1972 to allow time to seek alternative accommodation.

Following the pullout of the British forces, the building was assigned by the Bases Economic Conversion Department (BECD) to Ministry of Health for use as a secondary hospital to supplement the overcrowded Woodbridge Hospital. The new facility was earmarked as a site for the rehabilitation of patients with chronic schizophrenia. The first batch of 34 patients were moved into the 250 bed hospital in September 1975.

The building has seen use as the View Road Lodge – a foreign workers’ dormitory on two occasions – until 2017. The building today lies unoccupied. Based on the Master Plan for the area, the site is currently being reserved for redevelopment as part of the Woodlands North Coast Innovation District.
