= Woodlands Hospital =

- National Healthcare Group
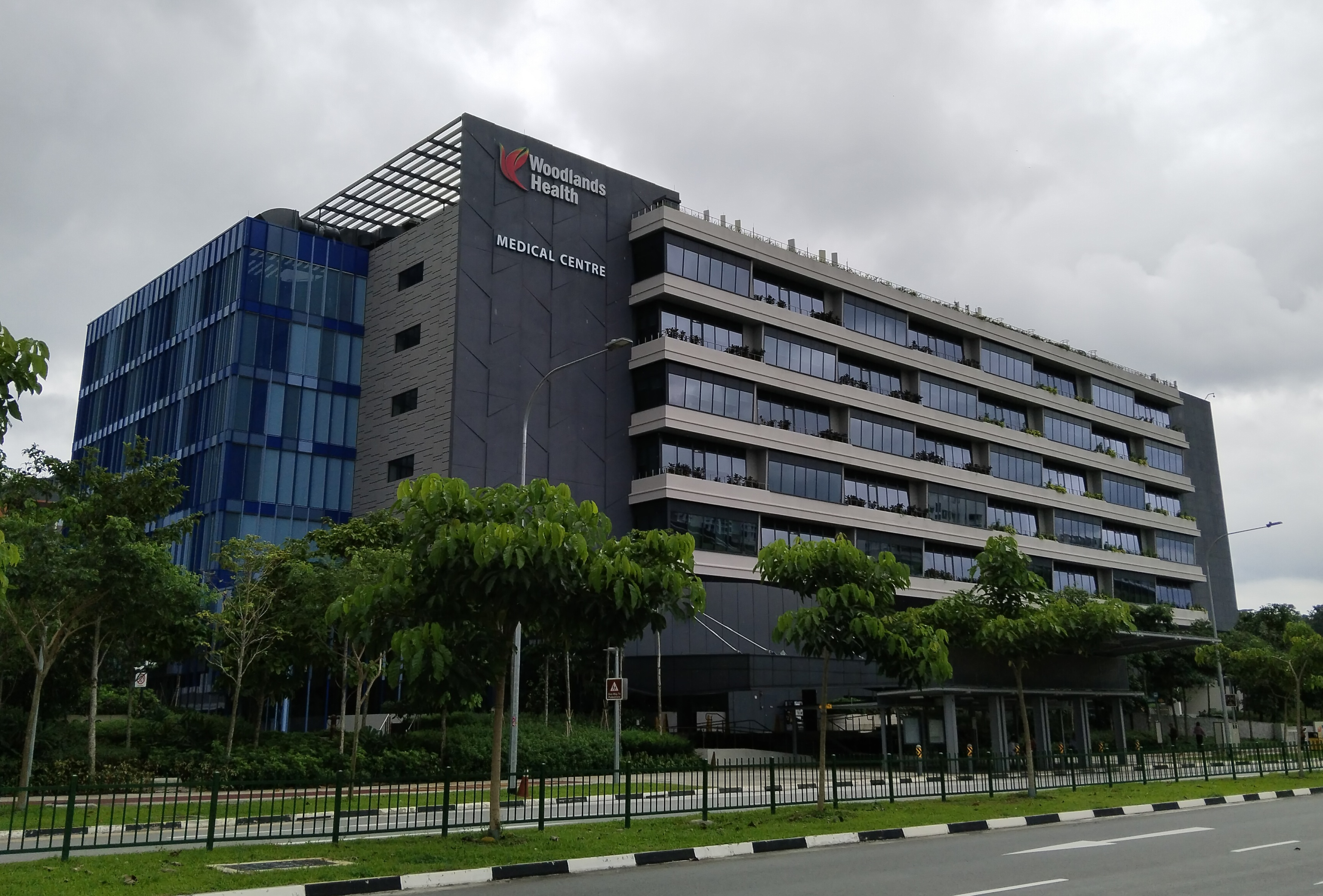
- Woodlands Health Campus in 2024

Geography
- Location: 17 Woodlands Drive 17, Singapore 737628, Singapore
- Coordinates: 1.4248°N 103.7950°E

Organisation
- Type: District General; Community hospital

Services
- Emergency department: Yes Accident & Emergency
- Beds: 1,800 (eventual ramp up capacity)

History
- Founded: 22 December 2023; 2 years ago (Note: Began operations); 13 July 2024; 17 months ago (Note: Official opening)

Links
- Website: www.wh.com.sg
- Lists: Hospitals in Singapore

Woodlands Hospital (abbreviation: WH), formerly known as Woodlands Health Campus (abbreviation: WHC), or colloquially as Woodlands General Hospital (abbreviation: WGH), is a public hospital in Woodlands, Singapore. The hospital officially opened on 13 July 2024 and alongside Woodlands serves the north and north-west regions of the country. Woodlands Hospital collectively consists of both acute and community facilities.

Operated by the National Healthcare Group (NHG), the hospital currently has 680 acute and community hospital beds, with an eventual ramp up to total capacity of 1,800 beds and offers general hospital services with community-based care and is part of Singapore's master plan in providing quality and accessible healthcare to all Singaporeans. The hospital also partners with primary care physicians, polyclinics and intermediate and long-term care providers to offer more community-based care.

== History ==
As Woodlands Health Campus, the healthcare facility had a groundbreaking ceremony on 18 April 2017.

The hospital started operations on 22 December 2023, with the official opening held on 13 July 2024. In August 2025, it was reported that the hospital had eased the workload at Khoo Teck Puat Hospital, which was the sole public hospital serving the north region of Singapore before 2024.

On 2 January 2026, the hospital was renamed to Woodlands Hospital.

== Facilities ==
A Healing Garden, consisting of 1.5ha of the parkland, was created between two of WH’s buildings as a purpose-built therapeutic garden. The garden is maintained by National Parks Board.

The campus also consisted of a 322-bed nursing home which is managed by Ren Ci Hospital.
