= Sengkang Community Hospital =

- SingHealth

Geography
- Location: 1 Anchorvale Street, Singapore 544835, Singapore
- Coordinates: 1.3964692°N 103.8912292°E

Organisation
- Type: Community hospital

Services
- Emergency department: No Accident & Emergency
- Beds: 400

History
- Founded: 28 August 2018; 7 years ago

Links
- Website: www.singhealth.com.sg/SCH
- Lists: Hospitals in Singapore

The Sengkang Community Hospital (abbreviation: SKCH) is a 400-bed community hospital in Sengkang, Singapore, next to Cheng Lim LRT station. It is part of an integrated healthcare development that includes the Sengkang General Hospital (abbreviated to SKH).
