= Alexandra Hospital =

Alexandra Hospital Hospital Alexandra (Malay) 亚历山大医院 (Chinese) அலெக்ஸாண்ட்ரா மருத்துவமனை (Tamil)
- National University Health System
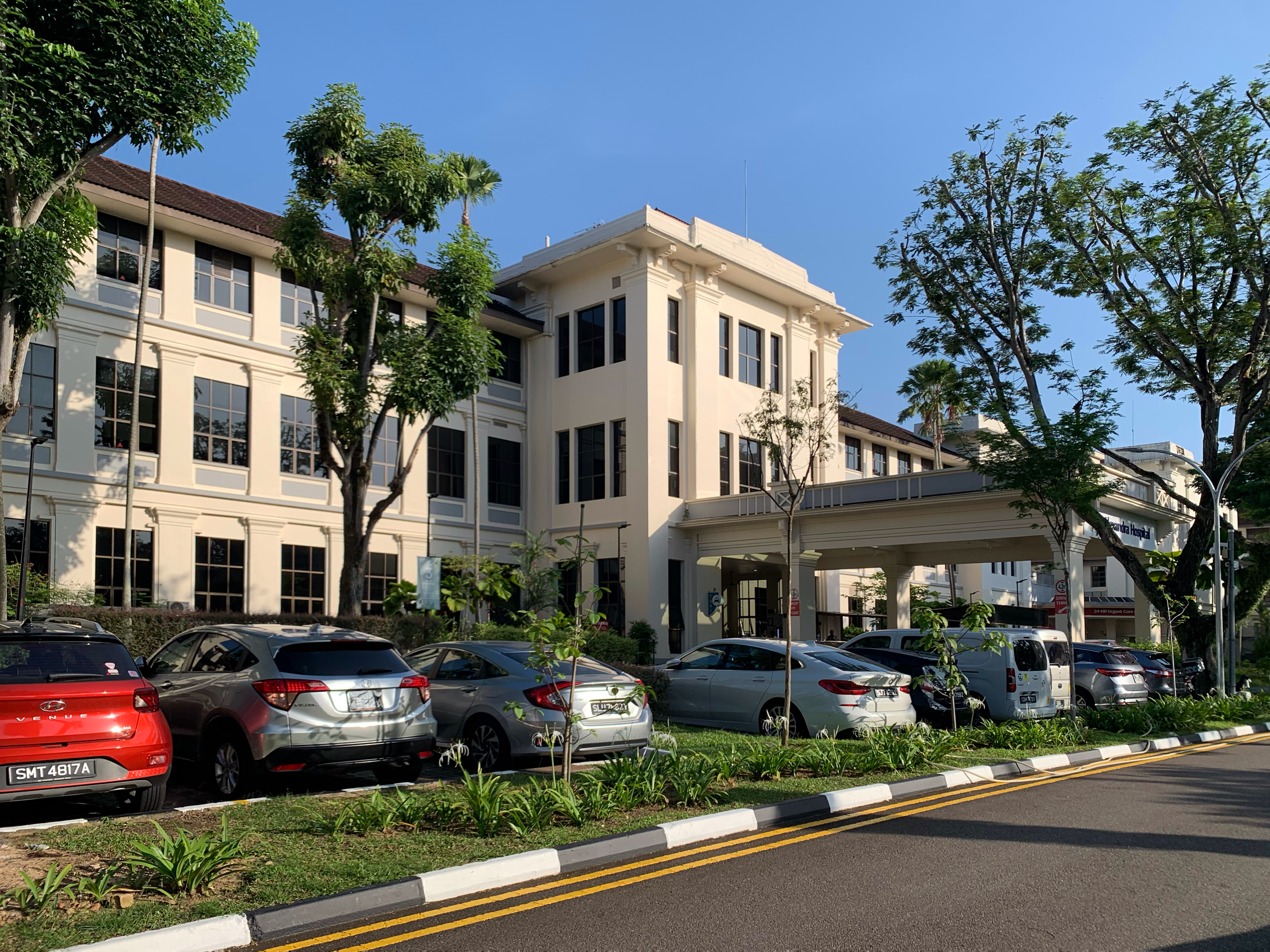
- The main building of Alexandra Hospital in 2025

Geography
- Location: 378 Alexandra Road, Queenstown, Singapore
- Coordinates: 1°17′11.2″N 103°48′04.4″E

Organisation
- Care system: Public
- Type: District General

Services
- Emergency department: Yes Accident & Emergency
- Beds: 300

History
- Founded: 1938; 88 years ago (as British Military Hospital); 1971; 55 years ago (current)

Links
- Website: www.ah.com.sg
- Lists: Hospitals in Singapore

Alexandra Hospital (AH) is a district general hospital located in Queenstown, Singapore that provides acute and community care under the National University Health System (NUHS). It has over 300 beds.

The hospital's colonial-style buildings were constructed in the late 1930s on 110,000 square metres (1,200,000 sq ft) of land. Under British rule, it was known as the British Military Hospital and was the site of a massacre in February 1942 by the Japanese as they took over Singapore in World War II.

After the liberation of Singapore, the hospital was returned to its British administration, before being handed over to the Singapore government on 11 September 1971. Since then, it has gone through four changes of administration, most recently on 1 June 2018, to a team of long-term stewards under the NUHS.

== History ==
=== Old malaria ward ===
Before the establishment of a hospital, a building located at what is now a football field in Alexandra Hospital, dating back to at least 1910, was used to house patients with malaria.

=== British Military Hospital ===
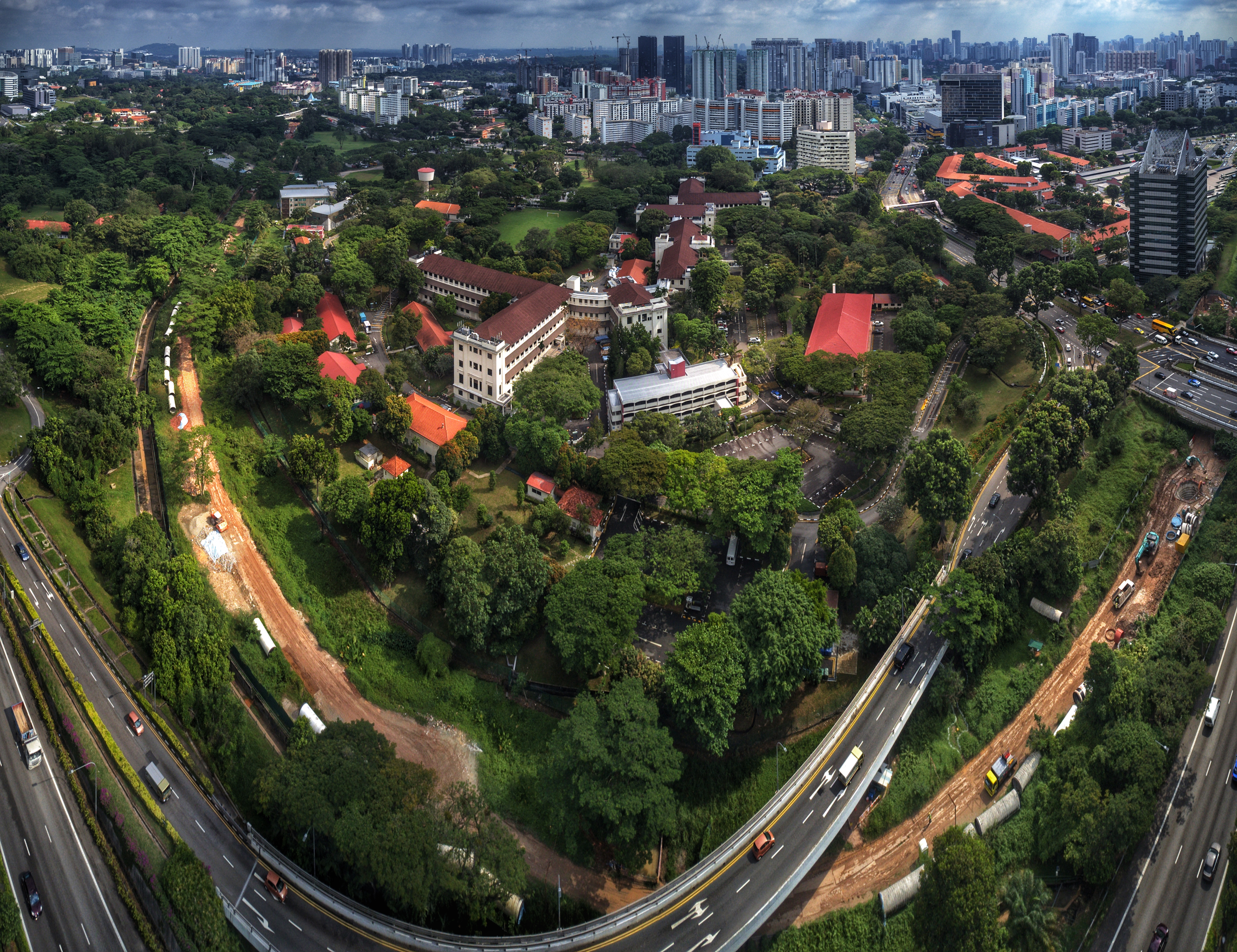
Alexandra Hospital and its leafy surroundings, October 2018

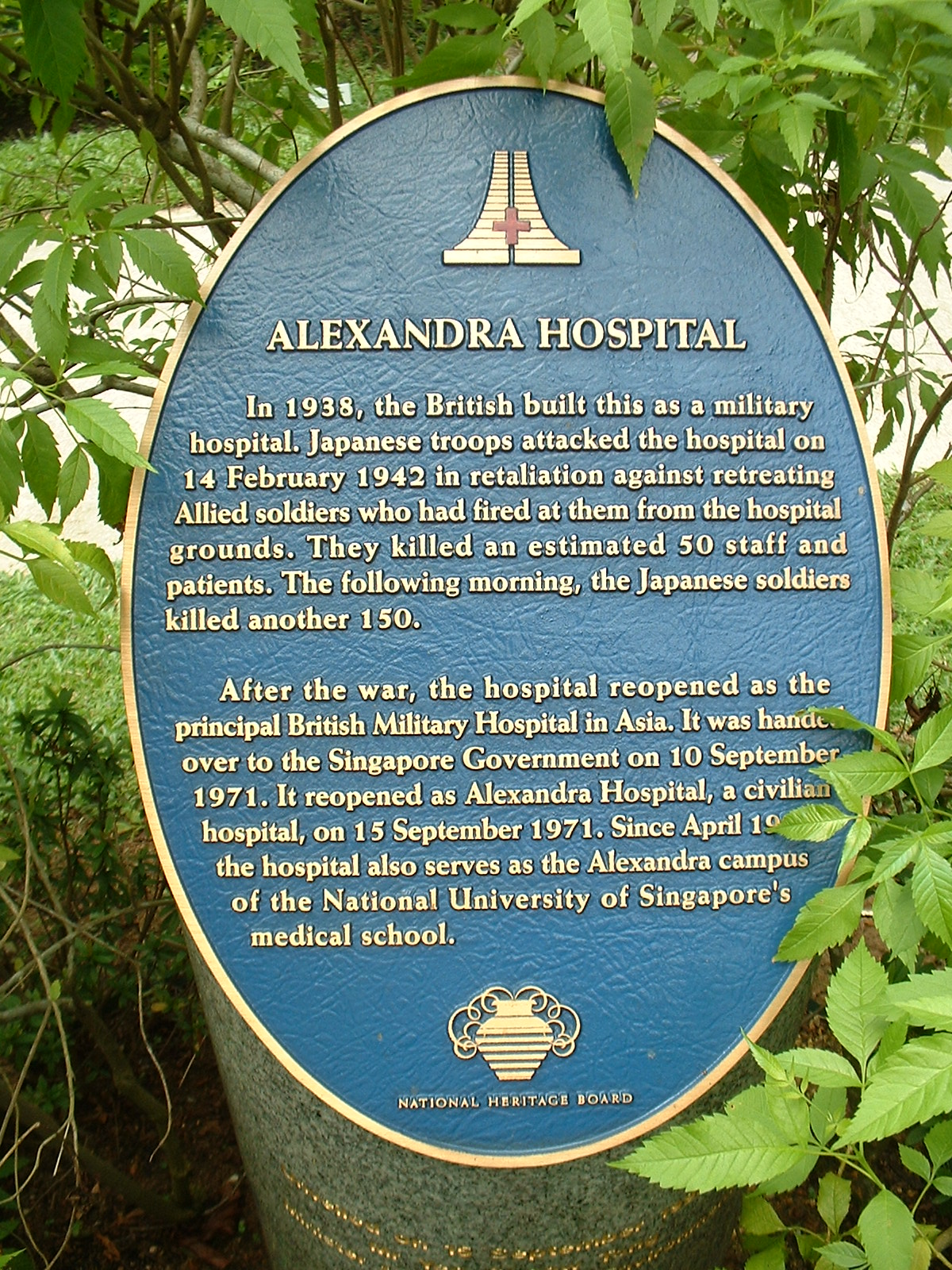
National Heritage Board's plaque on the grounds of Alexandra Hospital

Established in 1938 as the British Military Hospital, the facility served as the principal military hospital of the British Far East Command. During the Fall of Singapore in February 1942, it was the scene of a massacre by Japanese soldiers of wounded British servicemembers and medical staff. After World War II, Alexandra Hospital remained as one of the most modern hospitals in Singapore up to the 1970s.

In its heyday, Alexandra Hospital was an institution that adopted cutting-edge medical technology and in 1975 became the first hospital in Southeast Asia to successfully perform limb re-attachment to a patient. Alexandra Hospital also employed several renowned medical experts, including:

- Sir Roy Calne, internationally renowned transplant surgeon
- Major A.P. Dignan, later Major General, Director of Army Surgery
- Sir David Weatherall, Regius professor of medicine and honorary director of the Institute of Molecular Medicine at the University of Oxford

=== Post-independence ===
Following the gradual downsizing and withdrawal of the British military presence in Singapore, the hospital was handed over to the government of Singapore on 11 September 1971 and renamed Alexandra Road General Hospital. On 1 October 2000, the hospital became a member of the National Healthcare Group and underwent a major upgrade of its facilities.

=== Restructuring and changes in management ===
In 2001, plans were made to move to a new hospital in Jurong by 2006. However, in 2004, the plans were scrapped in favour of a move to a new 500-bed hospital in Yishun to be called Northern General Hospital, by 28 March 2009. (This hospital in Yishun is not to be confused with another new hospital planned for the nearby Woodlands, announced in March 2006 on the grounds that Northern General would not be able to serve enough people living in the north.)

On 16 May 2007, Health Minister Khaw Boon Wan, while attending the HIMSS AsiaPac 2007 conference, announced that the name of the new general hospital in Yishun was to be Khoo Teck Puat Hospital (KTPH). The family of late Mr Khoo Teck Puat had donated S$125 million for hospital construction and funding. The new hospital was to be different from other hospitals as it promises to put patients first and aims to minimise bureaucracy and paperwork. It was initially planned for Alexandra Hospital to be closed after KTPH was opened, but after August 2010, the hospital was kept in operation and transferred to Jurong Health after August 2010.

On 8 September 2012, Health Minister Gan Kim Yong announced that the hospital will remain in operation at least until 2018, but the team slated to run the Sengkang General and Community Hospitals will take over the facilities after the opening of Ng Teng Fong General Hospital in 2014–2015. A decision on the future of the hospital will be made nearer to 2018, said the Health Minister. Previously, Sengkang Health took over from JurongHealth ceased operations at Alexandra Hospital to prepare for the opening of Ng Teng Fong General Hospital.

On 26 January 2015, with the Ng Teng Fong General Hospital opening in July 2015, Alexandra Hospital was to be closed for maintenance and renovation. Specialist Outpatient Clinics Services continued to operate at AH until its move to NTFGH. Alexandra Hospital was to be taken over by Sengkang Health and reopened in phases by the third quarter of 2015. JurongHealth ceased operations at Alexandra Hospital (AH) at 5.30 pm on 29 June 2015 to prepare for the opening of NTFGH the next day. This was to include the hospital's Specialist Outpatient Clinics and Emergency Department. Sengkang Health reopened the hospital in phases, with its Specialist Outpatient Clinics, operating theatres and other medical facilities becoming operational in 2016.

After Sengkang Health moved out of the premises, the National University Health System (NUHS) took over the hospital on 1 June 2018.

Since its takeover by the NUHS, the hospital provides care under a single continuum, from acute, sub-acute, to rehabilitative care. Through five key programmes (preventive care, urgent and acute care, long-term chronic care, elder care, and palliative care), care is provided to each patient by a team led by one principal doctor. This model of health and care is defined by elements abbreviated as OOOOOH (One patient, One bed, One care team, One principal doctor, One with the community, Healthcare redesign).

== Future developments ==
Alexandra Hospital will be redeveloped into an integrated health campus by 2030, in view of the rising demand in health and medical services set to increase, as the population intensifies in the southwestern region of Singapore, and will be first public hospital redeveloped after the COVID-19 pandemic.

The future hospital is planned to be pandemic-ready, green and sustainable, with phygital (seamlessly-integrated physical and digital) care, new roles for nurses and caregivers, under a resource-efficient Integrated General Hospital (IGH) model: "One patient, One bed, One care team, One principal doctor, One with the community, Healthcare" (OOOOOH). It will also incorporate six peaks of excellence in areas such as Integrated Care, Geriatric Medicine, Supportive and Palliative Care Medicine, Rehabilitative Medicine, Psychological Medicine, Ambulatory Surgery. Psychiatric services will also be set up, with inpatient wards to cater for acute and sub-acute psychiatric care and rehabilitation, as well as services on medical psychiatry, child and adolescent psychiatry, and psychogeriatrics.

In 2023, Alexandra established the Centre for Healthy Longevity (CHL), a longevity medicine center focused on maintaining individuals as close as possible to optimal performance across the lifespan by targeting biological aging as the greatest driver of diseases of aging. With a S$5 million gift from the Lien Foundation, the Center will conduct clinical trials and care for patients using nutrition, exercise, dietary supplements and repurposed drugs. Complementing the geroscience basic research at National University Health System led by Dr. Brian K. Kennedy, the Center's mission is to increase the Singapore population's healthspan by five years by slowing biological aging.

Alexandra Hospital will form part of a future Health District in Queenstown and with an increased clinical capacity, support the Healthier SG initiative. Details of this plan were further revealed when the hospital held a groundbreaking ceremony for its redevelopment on 15 May 2024, where it was announced that new inpatient and outpatient blocks would be built, and the hospital would open progressively from 2028 onwards.

== Services ==
=== Urgent Care Centre ===
The Urgent Care Centre is a 24-hour clinic that provides immediate medical attention to walk-in patients with acute and urgent medical conditions, as well as those admitted to Alexandra Hospital via private ambulance. For patients requiring more than basic care, blood and radiological tests and further treatment are administered under the care of a single holistic care team.

=== Community Care Coordination Unit (C3U) @ AH ===
The Community Care Coordination Unit (C3U) @ AH is a multidisciplinary team that bring together healthcare teams and care managers to work with patients, families, and community partners for early clinical and social interventions.

=== Specialties ===
Medical	Surgical	Allied health
Internal medicine; Family medicine; Cardiology; Endocrinology; Gastroenterology; Geriatric medicine; Gynaecology; Nephrology; Neurology; Psychiatry; Rehabilitation medicine; Respiratory medicine; Rheumatology	Orthopaedic surgery; General surgery; Otolaryngology; Ophthalmology; Anaesthesia	Physiotherapy; Speech therapy; Occupational therapy; Podiatry; Dietetics; Diagnostic imaging; Care and counselling

== Gardens ==
A 20 hectare medicinal garden was opened at AH on 30 July 2005. The garden was based on a book by Singaporean botanist Wee Yeow Chin and took three months to plant the garden. The garden is part of providing a healing environment for patients and visitors.

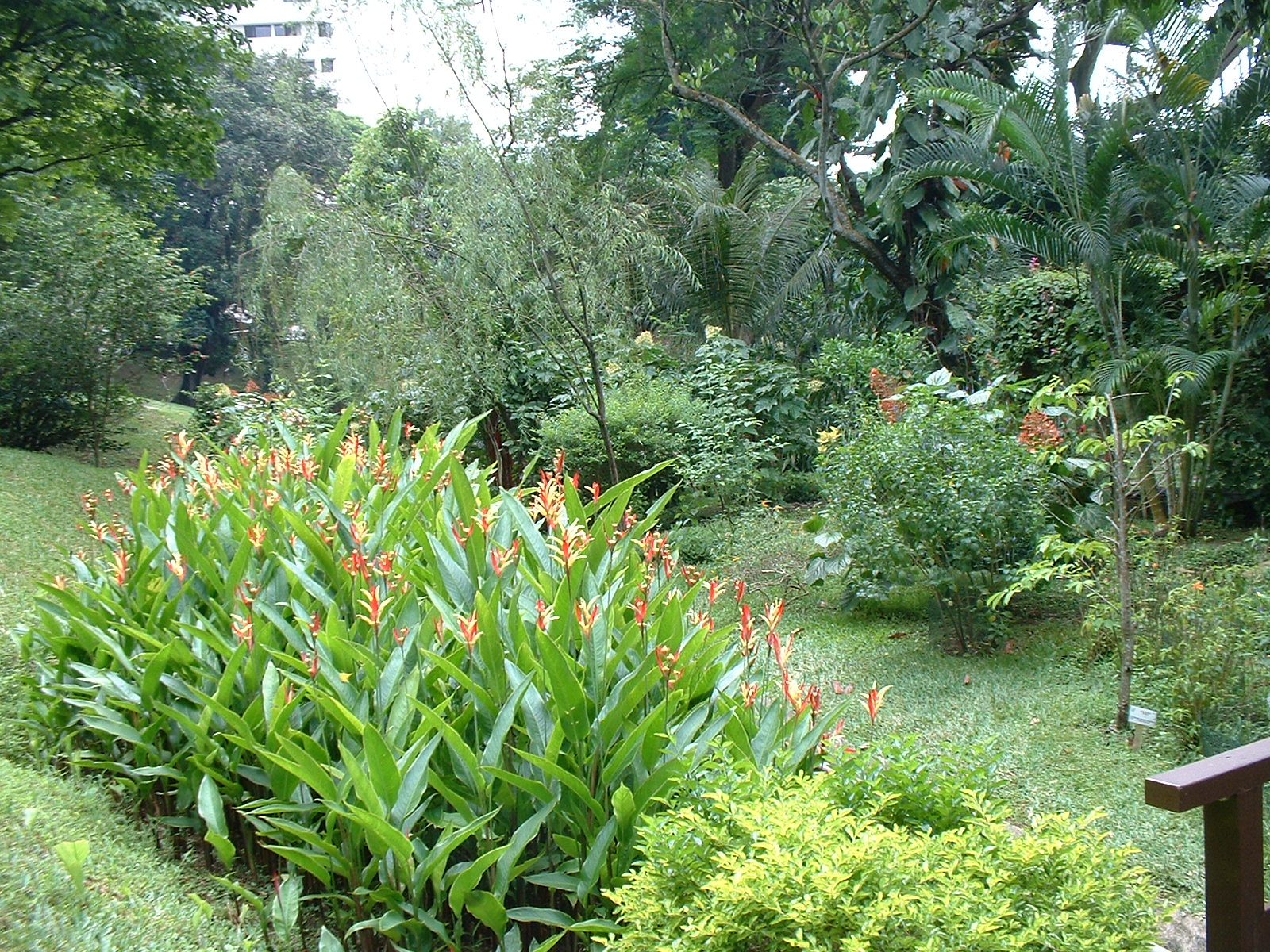
Alexandra Hospital gardens

Gardens surrounding the hospital are home to over 500 plant species and 100 butterfly species in the butterfly trail. Members of nature societies have used the hospital gardens as a study ground. The gardens were upgraded in 2000 under the direction of Rosalind Tan, senior executive at the hospital's operations department.

On 6 November 2019, a Therapeutic Horticulture Programme was started in the gardens to provide occupational therapy to patients. A commemorative plaque in the gardens honours the hundreds of hospitalized soldiers and staff massacred by Japanese forces in 1942.
