= Crawfurd Hospital =

Coordinates: 1.3268°N 103.8112°E

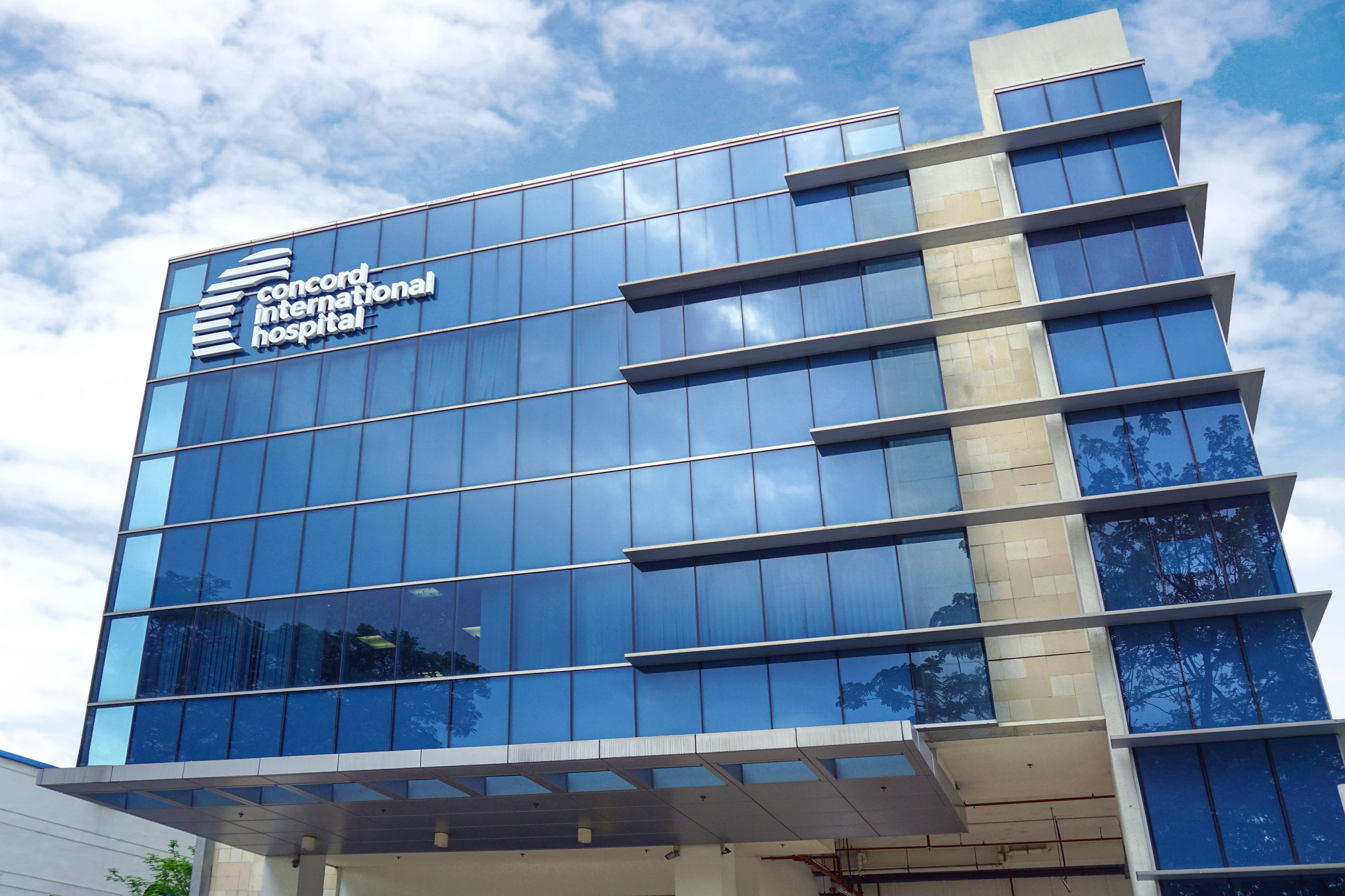
- Crawfurd Hospital Building

Geography
- Location: 19 Adam Road, Singapore 289891

Services
- Beds: 31

Crawfurd Hospital is a private hospital in Singapore.

== History ==
Initially known as Fortis Colorectal Hospital (FCH), the 31-bed facility first opened on 31 July 2012, costing $70 million and owned by Fortis Healthcare. It was later acquired by Concord Medical Services Holdings Limited in April 2015 and renamed Concord International Hospital (CIH).

In 2015, CIH entered collaboration with the University of Texas MD Anderson Cancer Centre (MDACC) of the United States. In November 2018, CIH opened its Women's Centre which has a team of specialists in breast, aesthetic and plastic, gynaecological and minimally-invasive surgery. The hospital also treats colorectal cancer, prostate cancer and breast cancer.

CIH was suspended over lapses in patient safety in December 2020 and was divested by Concord Medical. It was subsequently taken over by Crawfurd Medical and resumed operations in July 2021 under its current name.
