= Singapore General Hospital =

Hospital in Singapore

- SingHealth

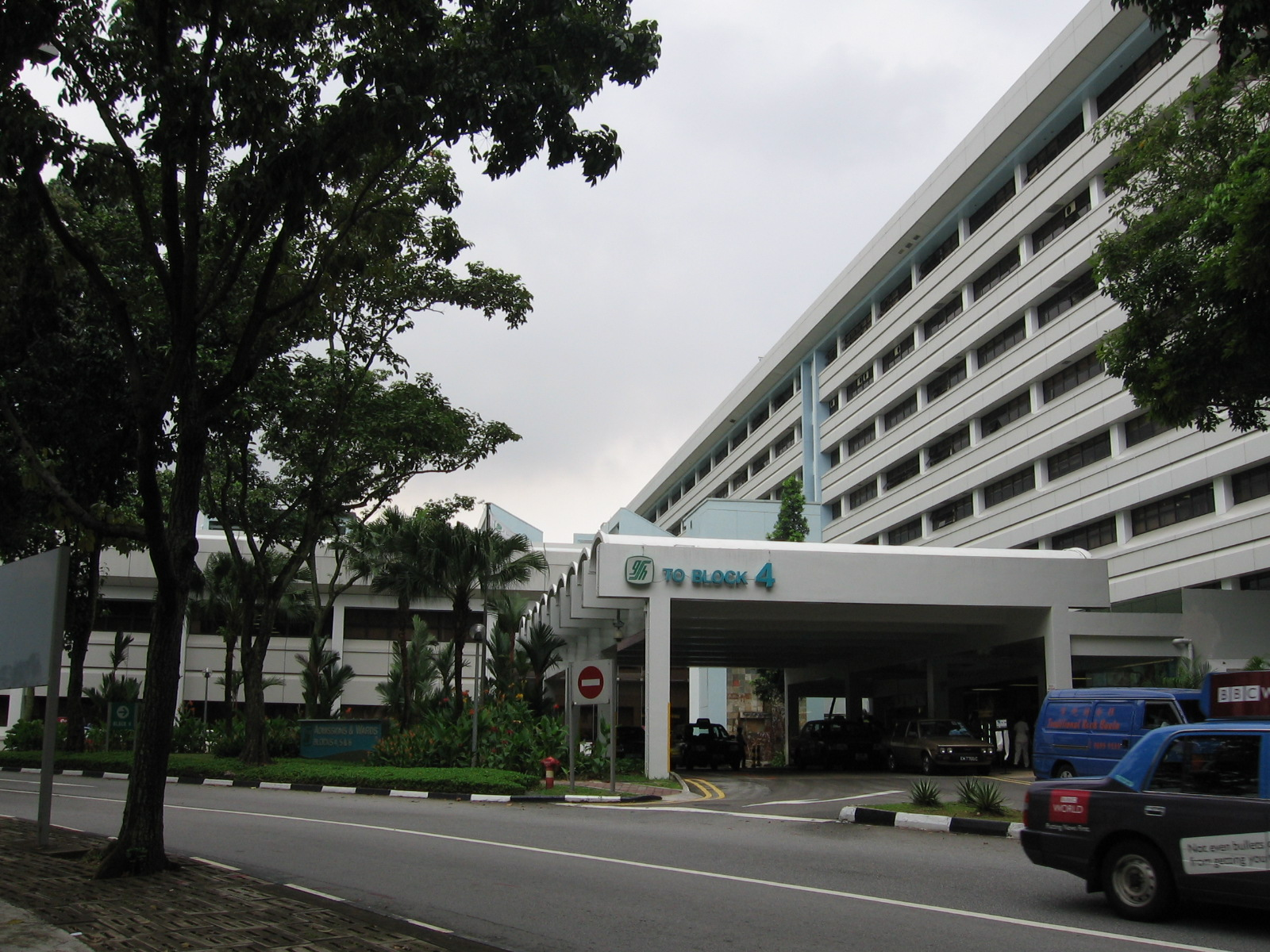
- Singapore General Hospital's Block 4 in 2005

Geography
- Location: Bukit Merah, Central Region, Singapore
- Coordinates: 1°16′43.2″N 103°50′03.7″E

Organisation
- Type: Teaching
- Affiliated university: Duke–NUS Medical School, National University of Singapore (NUS)

Services
- Emergency department: Yes Accident & Emergency
- Beds: 2,440

Helipads
| Number | Length | | Surface |
| Number | ft | m | Surface |
|---|---|---|---|
| 1 | | | Concrete |

History
- Founded: 1821; 205 years ago

Links
- Website: www.sgh.com.sg
- Lists: Hospitals in Singapore

Singapore General Hospital (SGH) (Note: Malay: Hospital Besar Singapura; Chinese: 新加坡中央医院; Tamil: சிங்கப்பூர் பொது மருத்துவமனை) is an academic health science centre and tertiary referral hospital in Singapore. It is located next to the Bukit Merah and Chinatown districts of the Central Region, close to the Outram Community Hospital (OCH), which functions as a supplementary community and rehabilitation hospital to SGH for newly discharged patients. There is also the Outram Polyclinic to complement outpatient care. All of these institutions are operated by SingHealth, which comes under the purview of the Ministry of Health (MOH).

It is the largest and oldest hospital in Singapore and functions as the country's national hospital. The foundation of its first building was laid in 1821, before its first major expansion in 1926. Subsequent expansions as well as renovations were also made in the following decades.

SGH is the flagship hospital of SingHealth, the country's largest group of public healthcare institutions and the principal teaching hospital for the Duke–NUS Medical School, which is affiliated with Duke University and the National University of Singapore. Its campus includes four national speciality centres, namely the Singapore National Eye Centre (SNEC), the National Heart Centre Singapore (NHCS), the National Cancer Centre Singapore (NCCS), and the National Dental Centre Singapore (NDCS). A fifth specialty centre, the Elective Care Centre Singapore (ECC), is currently under construction and expected to be completed in 2025.

SGH has been considered as being one of the best hospitals in the world, being consistently ranked in the top 10 by Newsweek, reaching its highest ranking of 3rd in 2019. It is the highest ranked hospital in Asia, drawing in patients from around the region, with SGH performing near the highest number of transplants in the country, including both solid hematologic and organ transplantation.

== History ==
=== Early years ===
The Singapore General Hospital was established in 1821, when the first General Hospital was located in the cantonment for British troops near the Singapore River. It later shifted to Pearl Banks apartment and then to the Kandang Kerbau district, before finally settling at Sepoy Lines along Outram Road in 1882.

The modern history of Singapore General Hospital began on 29 March 1926, with the opening of 800 beds in the Bowyer, Stanley and Norris Blocks. Today, only the Bowyer Block with its historically distinctive clock tower remains. The Bowyer Block is now home to the Singapore General Hospital Museum or the SGH Museum.

In 1981, the hospital was rebuilt, with its current 8-block complex housing in-patient wards, ambulatory and support services, research laboratories and a postgraduate medical institute.

On 1 April 1989, the hospital was restructured, in an effort to modernise the organisation of the hospital, due to rapidly developing changes in healthcare services and patient expectations for better service. As a restructured hospital, the Singapore General Hospital is still 100 per cent government-owned and is a not-for-profit institution. More than 60 per cent of the beds are allocated for subsidised patients, giving them access to an internationally established standard of affordable healthcare.

=== 21st century ===
On 31 March 2000, a major reorganisation of the public sector healthcare services was initiated by the Ministry of Health (MOH). Since then, the Singapore General Hospital came under the management of Singapore Health Services or SingHealth.

In 2018, SGH announced that it will be expanding its accident and emergency (A&E) facilities, which include constructing a new 12-storey specialised building that will be four times larger than the hospital's existing A&E facilities. The building will be connected to its specialty centres as well as the Outram Community Hospital. It is expected to begin operations in 2023.

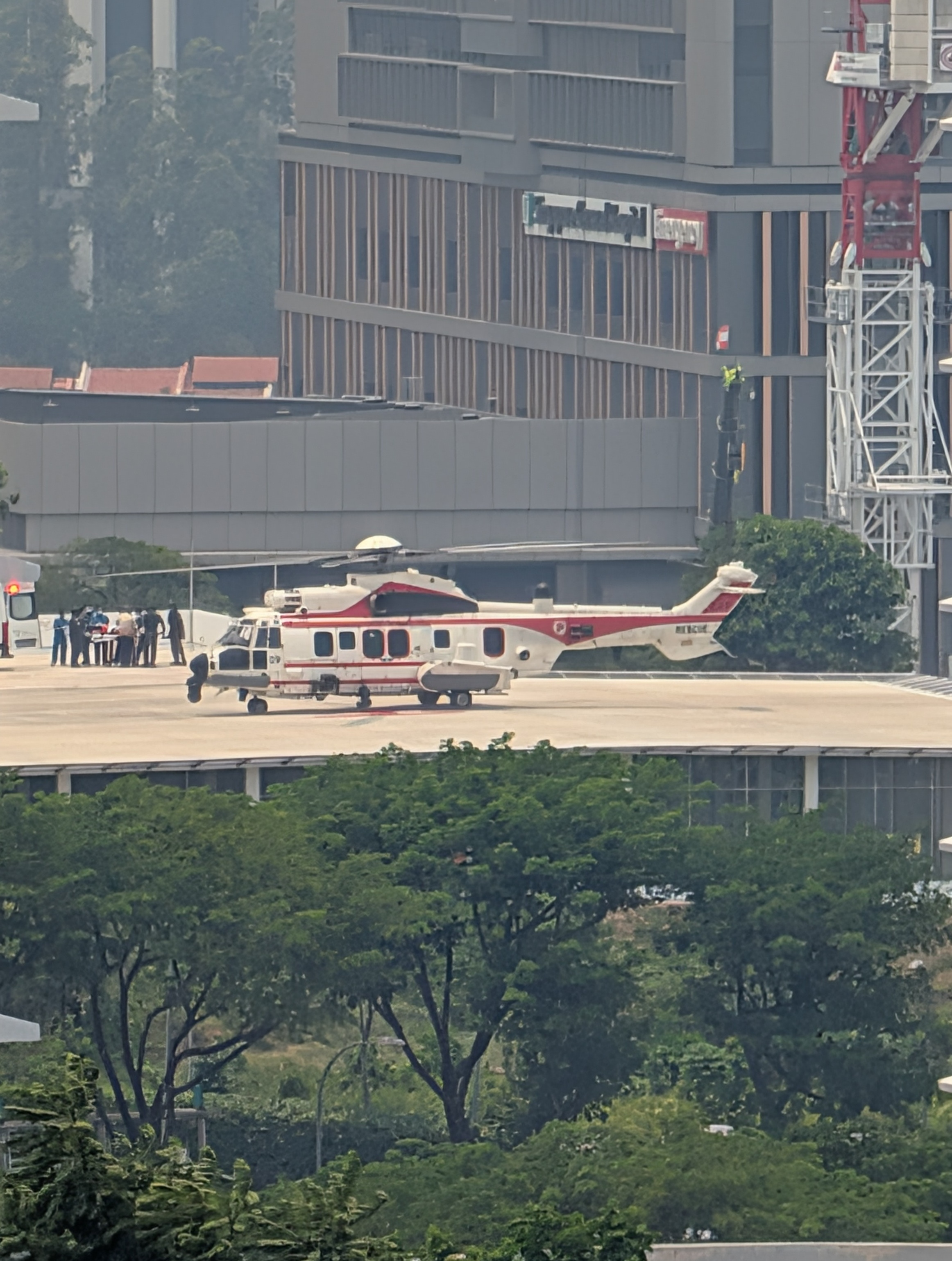
A H225M medium lift helicopter from Republic of Singapore Air Force's unit Rescue 10 on SGH's helipad.

In 2026, it was reported a new helipad was constructed along College Road, which is near the hospital's emergency department. SGH had an old helipad along MacAlister Road which is a grassland clearing.

== The SGH Museum ==
The Singapore General Hospital Museum is a repository of artefacts and records, where visitors can trace the long and rich history of the Singapore General Hospital. It is also a place where one can learn about the development of medical specialties and medical education in Singapore, presented with the aid of audio-visual and multimedia technology.

The SGH Museum was officially opened by President SR Nathan on 20 May 2005. The museum adopts a thematic approach in presenting the hospital's long history, where visitors get not just an insight into the significant developments of the hospital through the years, but also an understanding of the impact these incidents have on the people and the community.

== National specialty centres ==
=== Singapore National Eye Centre ===
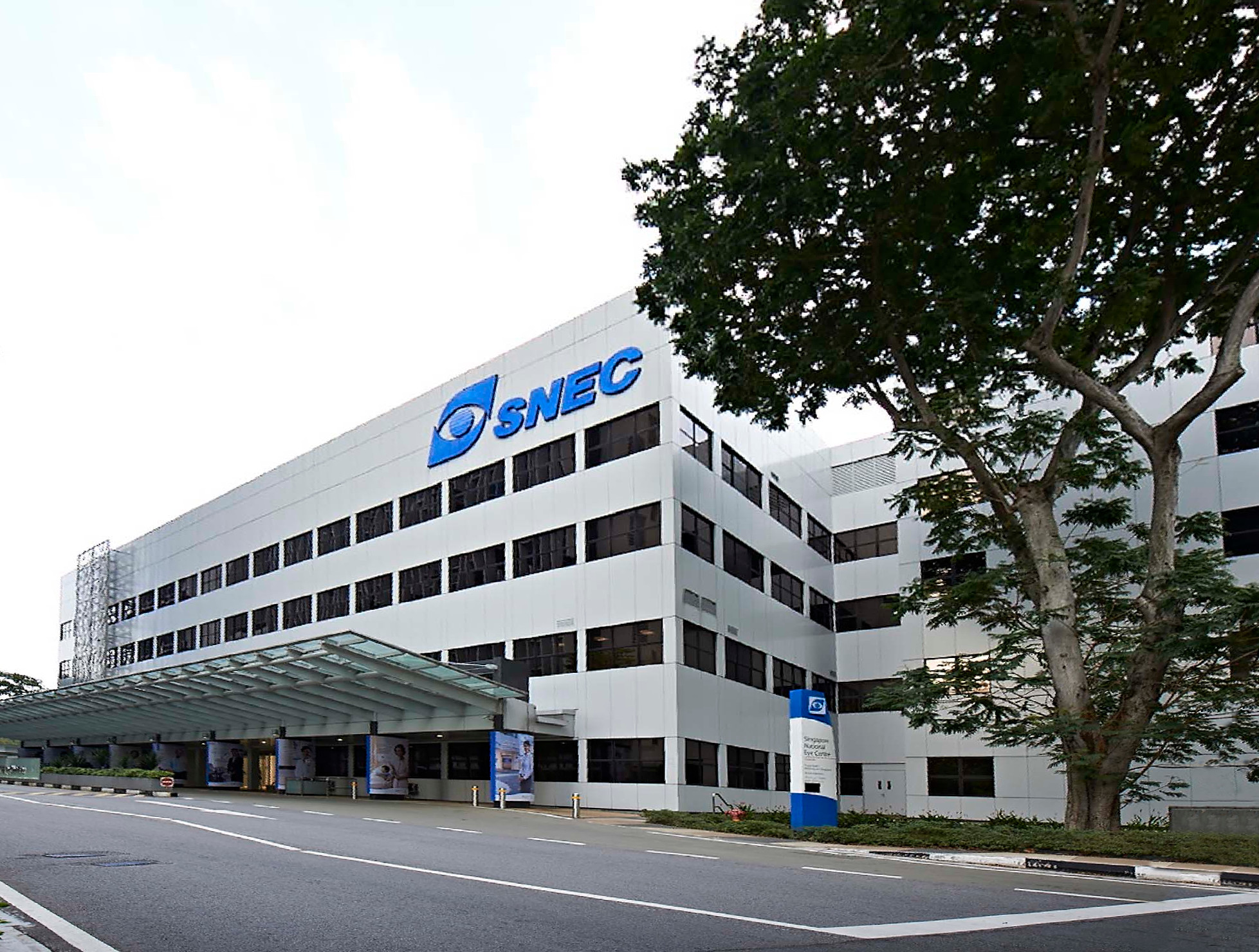
Singapore National Eye Centre

Singapore National Eye Centre (SNEC) is a specialty centre for ophthalmological services and is the largest ophthalmology specialist centre in Singapore. It was founded in 1990 to lead and organise specialised ophthalmological services with special emphasis on research and education. Since its inauguration, SNEC has averaged an annual workload of 14,000 major eye surgeries and 13,000 laser procedures. The SNEC also actively participates in clinical trials and researches the causes to find treatments to eye conditions such as myopia and glaucoma.

SNEC's facilities includes 50 consultation suites, 9 operating theatres, research facilities, offices and a library in two adjoining buildings.

=== National Cancer Centre Singapore ===
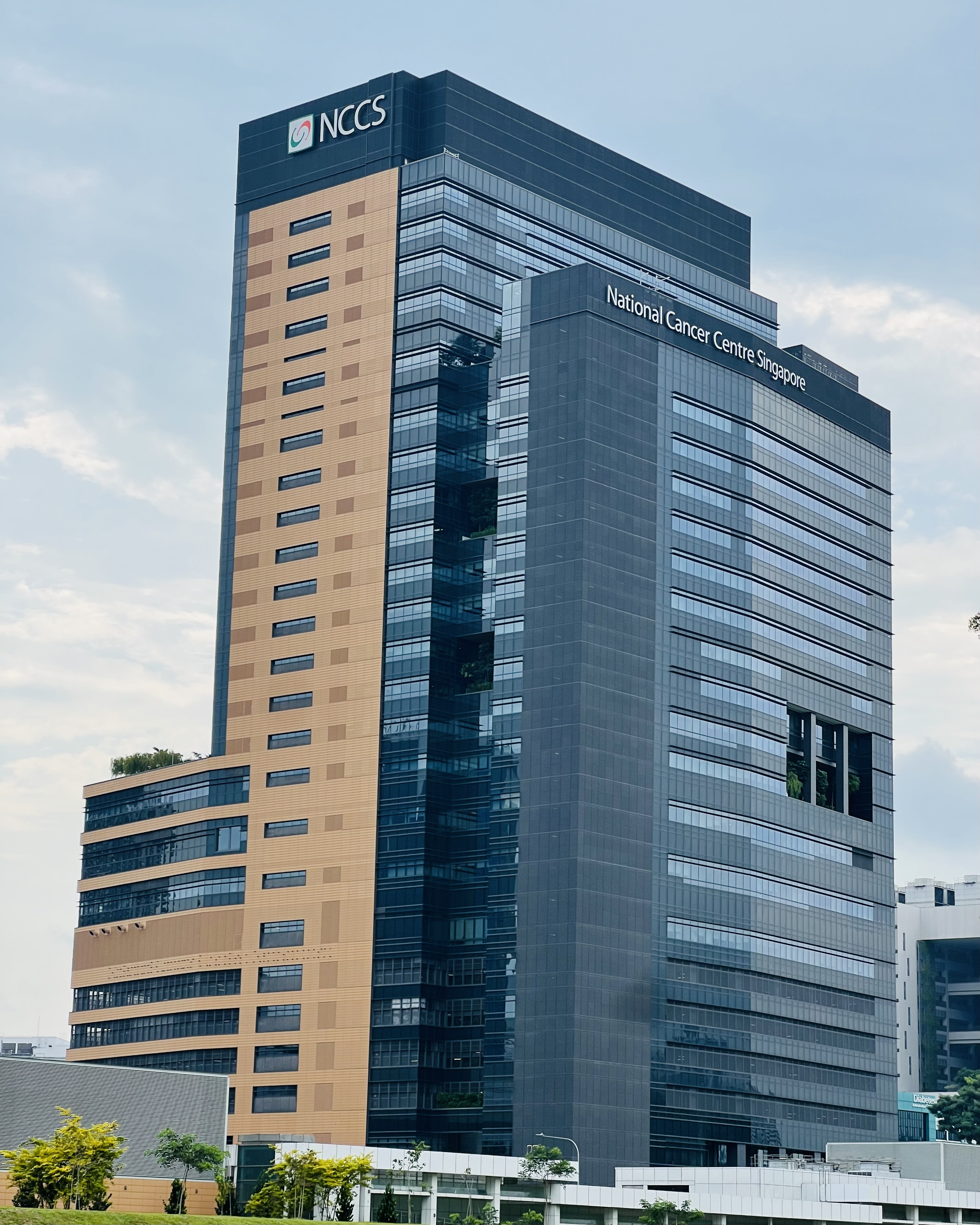
National Cancer Centre Singapore

The National Cancer Centre Singapore (NCCS) was originally established in 1993 as a unit of Singapore General Hospital, and subsequently became an autonomous institution of SingHealth. It is the country's national specialty centre for the diagnosis, research and treatment of cancer. The centre has more than 200 oncologists.

The centre's founding director is Professor Soo Khee Chee. NCCS provides a range of medical, educational and research activities within a single institution; and practices a multi-disciplinary approach to diagnosis and treatment. It is Southeast Asia's only full multi-disciplinary sub-specialist centre for cancer.

In addition, the centre is a teaching institution for post-graduate cancer education that trains and offers fellowships for many local and overseas doctors, nurses, para-medical professionals and researchers.

On 2 June 2017, construction for an additional building to the NCCS began, which include more facilities to cater to increased patients' access to cancer treatment as well as the specialty centre's capacity. Slated to begin operations in 2022, it will also include a new Proton Therapy Centre, which allows the NCCS to engage in proton therapy to treat cancer in their patients. It is the first hospital in the region to have such facilities.

=== National Heart Centre Singapore ===
The National Heart Centre Singapore (NHCS) is a specialist medical centre and a regional referral centre for cardiovascular diseases. Established in 1994 as the Singapore Heart Centre in the Singapore General Hospital, the heart centre took over the hospital's cardiac services and set up a cardiology laboratory in 1995. It was renamed in 1998. In 2014, NHCS completed its move to a new purpose-built building at 5 Hospital Drive. The new building not only includes facilities for outpatient clinics and non-invasive testing, but also has operating theatres and an invasive cardiac catheterisation laboratory.

With over 9,000 inpatient admissions every year, the 186-bed specialty centre for cardiovascular disease in Singapore offers treatments from preventive to rehabilitative cardiac services.

=== National Dental Centre Singapore ===
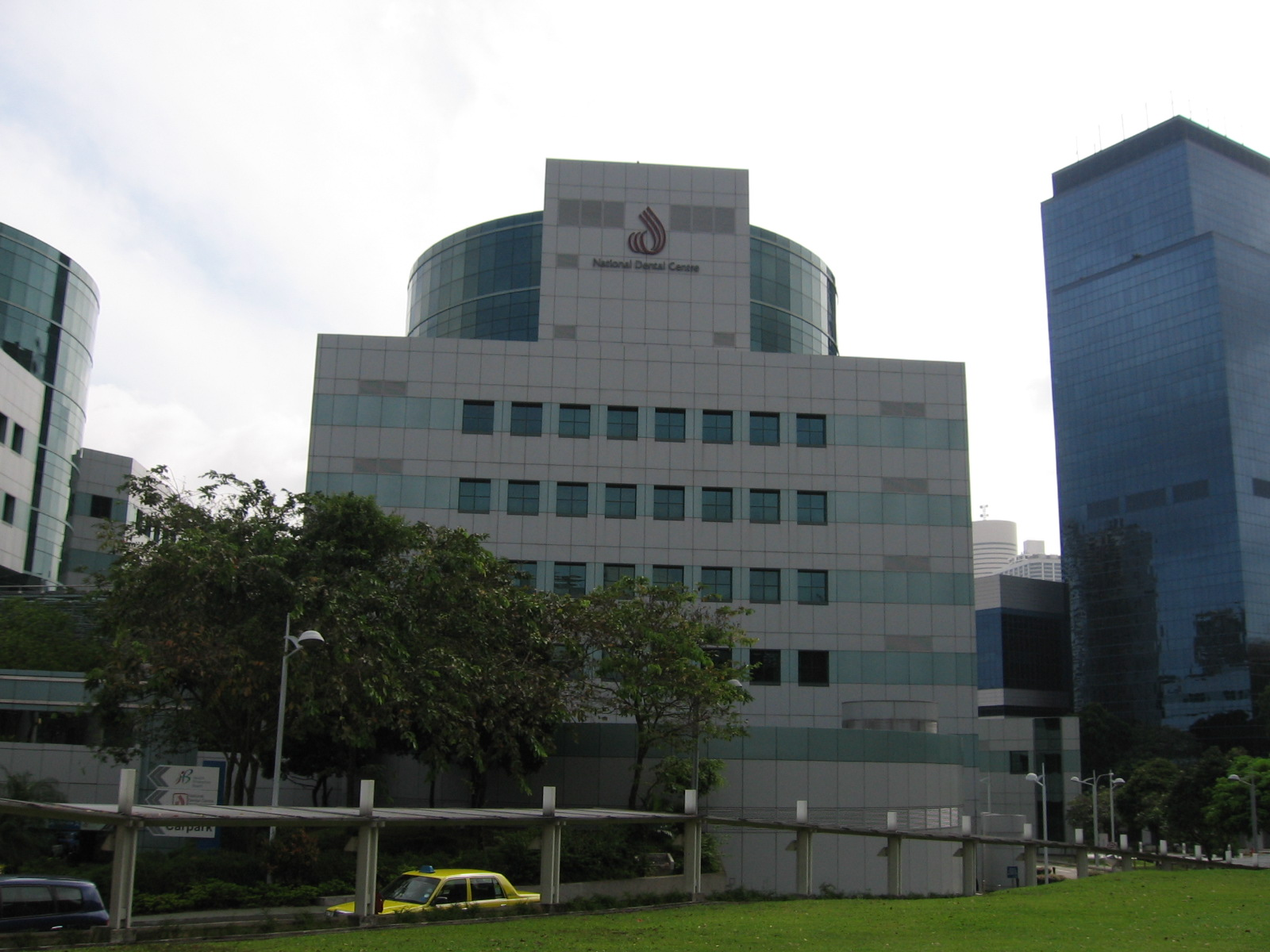
National Dental Centre Singapore

The National Dental Centre Singapore (NDCS) is a facility in Singapore for specialist oral healthcare services. It commenced operations on 1 March 1997 and claims to offer the largest concentration of specialist expertise in a single facility. Its specialist teams attend to over 700 patients daily, including walk-in patients and those being referred to the centre. The centre is equipped with 92-chair facility and a day surgery suite.

The centre has three specialist clinical departments, being the Departments of Oral and Maxillofacial Surgery, Orthodontics and Restorative Dentistry, which attend to a wide range of oral conditions. In addition, Department of Restorative Dentistry also has sub-units in Endodontics, Paediatric Dentistry, Periodontics and Prosthodontics. Sub-speciality multidisciplinary services are available through NDCS's Centres for Corrective Jaw Surgery, Maxillofacial Rehabilitation and Facial Pain.

The centre is active in research as well as training activities, especially focusing on the professional education of dentists. NDCS has been under the management of Singapore Health Services Pte Ltd since 2002.

In 2019, the National University Centre for Oral Health, Singapore (NUCOHS) started operations at one-north, becoming the second national facility in Singapore to offer specialised dental health services. Although not a part of SGH or SingHealth, it acts as a supplementary facility to keep up with the rising demand of public dental services in the country. A new and larger National Dental Centre Singapore is also currently being constructed, which is expected to more than double its capacity by 2025. These include expanding the Geriatric Special Care Dentistry Clinic, to meet the needs of the older generation in Singapore.

=== Elective Care Centre ===
The Elective Care Centre (ECC) is a facility that will focus on non-emergency surgeries, which aims to offload resources at the main hospital. It is currently under construction, and it is expected to begin operations in 2026.
