= Singapore National Eye Centre =

National specialty eye hospital in Singapore

- SingHealth
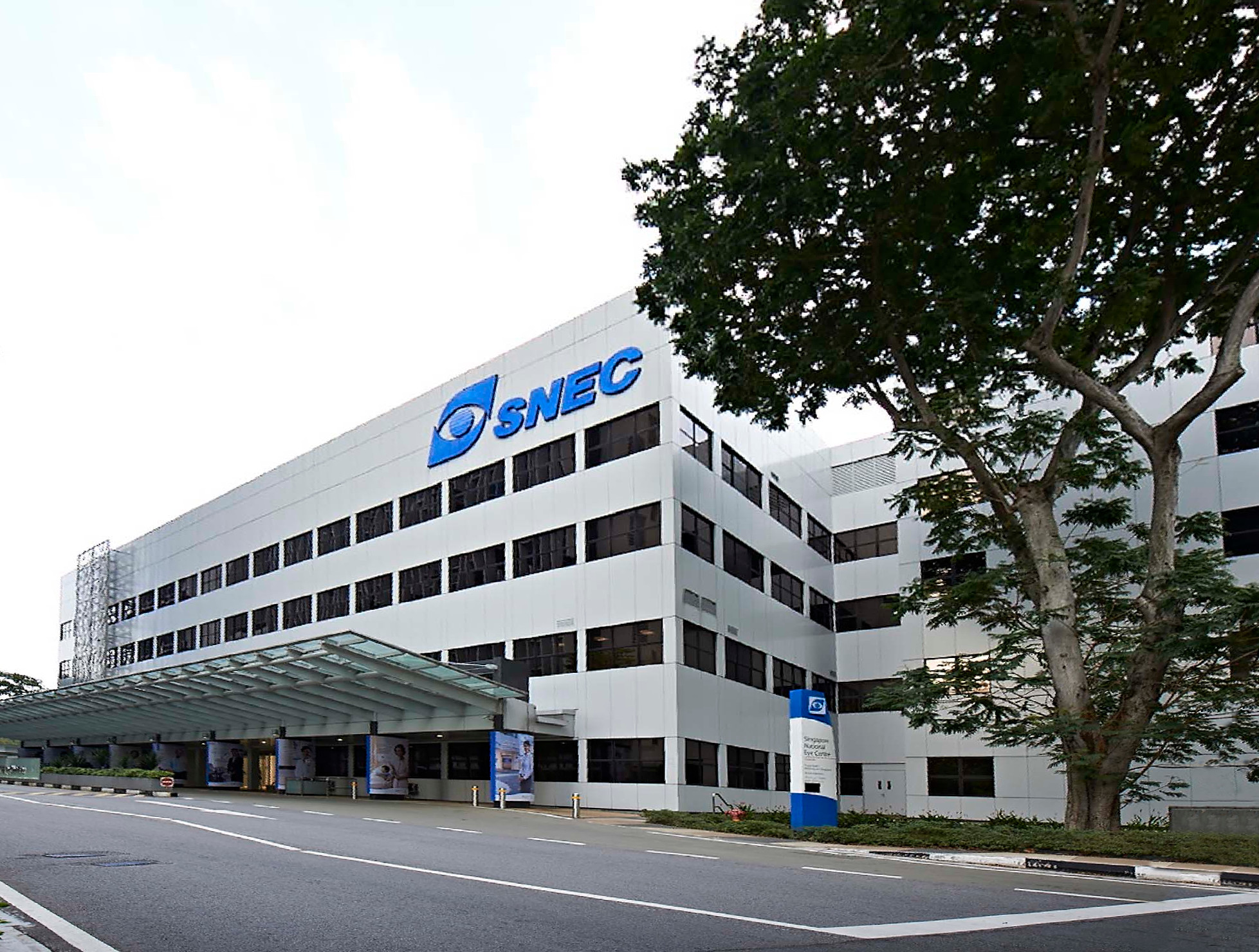

Geography
- Location: 11 Third Hospital Avenue, Singapore
- Coordinates: 1.282248009766369°N 103.8357848289906°E

Organisation
- Type: Specialist

Services
- Speciality: Eye

History
- Opened: October 1990

Links
- Website: www.snec.com.sg
- Lists: Hospitals in Singapore

The Singapore National Eye Centre (SNEC) is a national eye specialty centre in Singapore.

== History ==
In March 1989 the Singapore National Eye Centre Pte Ltd was set up as a subsidiary of the Health Corporation of Singapore, a company managing health related companies in SIngapore, to manage the SNEC. SNEC was expected to be operational in August 1990. SNEC was to lease an old surgical block from Singapore General Hospital (SGH), located beside SGH's Block 7.

In 1996, SNEC started building an extension, costing $20 million, beside its existing building in SGH. The extension would increase SNEC from 6,500 square meter to 14,500 square meter. It was expected to be completed by end 1997.

In 1997, the Singapore Eye Research Institute (SERI) was established as the centre's research arm for ophthalmic and vision research.

== Clinical Services ==
SNEC undertakes 100% video recording of major surgeries and a full audit of outcomes, as well as the pursuit of high-impact translational research.

== Sub-specialty Departments ==
- Cataract & Comprehensive Ophthalmology
- Cornea and External Eye Disease
- Glaucoma
- Neuro-Ophthalmology
- Ocular Inflammation & Immunology
- Oculoplastic
- Pediatric Ophthalmology and Adult Strabismus
- Refractive Surgery
- Medical Retina
- Surgical Retina

In 2025, SERI has been recognised as the top-ranked institute in the field of ophthalmology among all non-academic institutions worldwide, and second overall among all institutes (universities included) internationally, based on publications over the last five years according to ScholarGPS in 2025.

ScholarGPS ranks institutions based on the productivity, impact and quality of their active scholars, using metrics such as number of publications, citations (excluding self-citations) and h-index. These rankings are based on past five-year contributions, with each scholar's output weighted by author count.
