= Sengkang General Hospital =

Hospital in Singapore

Sengkang General Hospital 盛港综合医院 (Chinese) Hospital Besar Sengkang (Malay) செங்காங் பொது மருத்துவமனை (Tamil)
- SingHealth
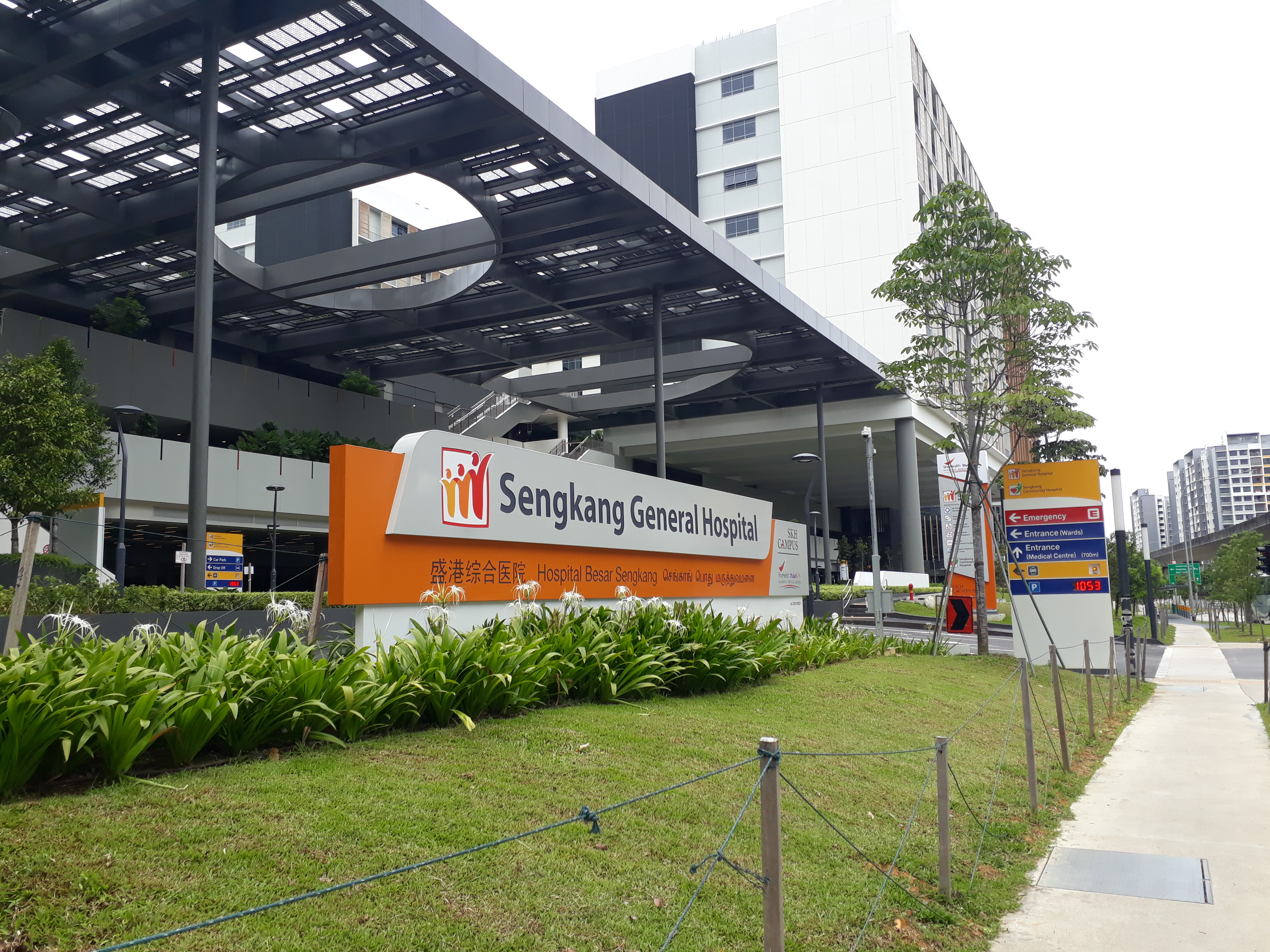
- Sengkang General Hospital

Geography
- Location: 110 Sengkang East Way, Singapore 544886, Singapore
- Coordinates: 1.3955°N 103.8934°E

Organisation
- Type: District General

Services
- Emergency department: Yes Accident & Emergency
- Beds: 1000

History
- Founded: 18 August 2018; 8 years ago

Links
- Website: www.skh.com.sg
- Lists: Hospitals in Singapore

Sengkang General Hospital (abbreviation: SKH) is one of Singapore's public hospitals. It has 1000 beds, and opened its doors on 18 August 2018. It serves mainly the population of northeast Singapore, in particular Sengkang, Punggol, Hougang and Pasir Ris. The hospital is managed by Sengkang Health.

Offering general hospital services with community-based care, the hospitals are part of Singapore's master plan in providing quality and accessible healthcare to all Singaporeans. The Sengkang General Hospital also partners with primary care physicians, polyclinics and intermediate and long-term care providers to offer more community-based care for the residents of northeast Singapore.

== History ==
The Sengkang General Hospital was first announced by the then-Minister for Health Mr Khaw Boon Wan during the Committee of Supply (COS) speech in 2011. The hospital is built by Penta Ocean.

The initial planned date of completion was 2020 but in December 2011, Minister for Health Mr Gan Kim Yong announced that the completion date will be moved forward by 2 years to 2018. On 27 October 2013, the hospital held its ground-breaking ceremony.

The hospital started operations on 18 August 2018.

The official opening of Sengkang General Hospital was held on 23 March 2019.
