= Institute of Mental Health (Singapore) =

Hospital in Hougang, Singapore

- National Healthcare Group

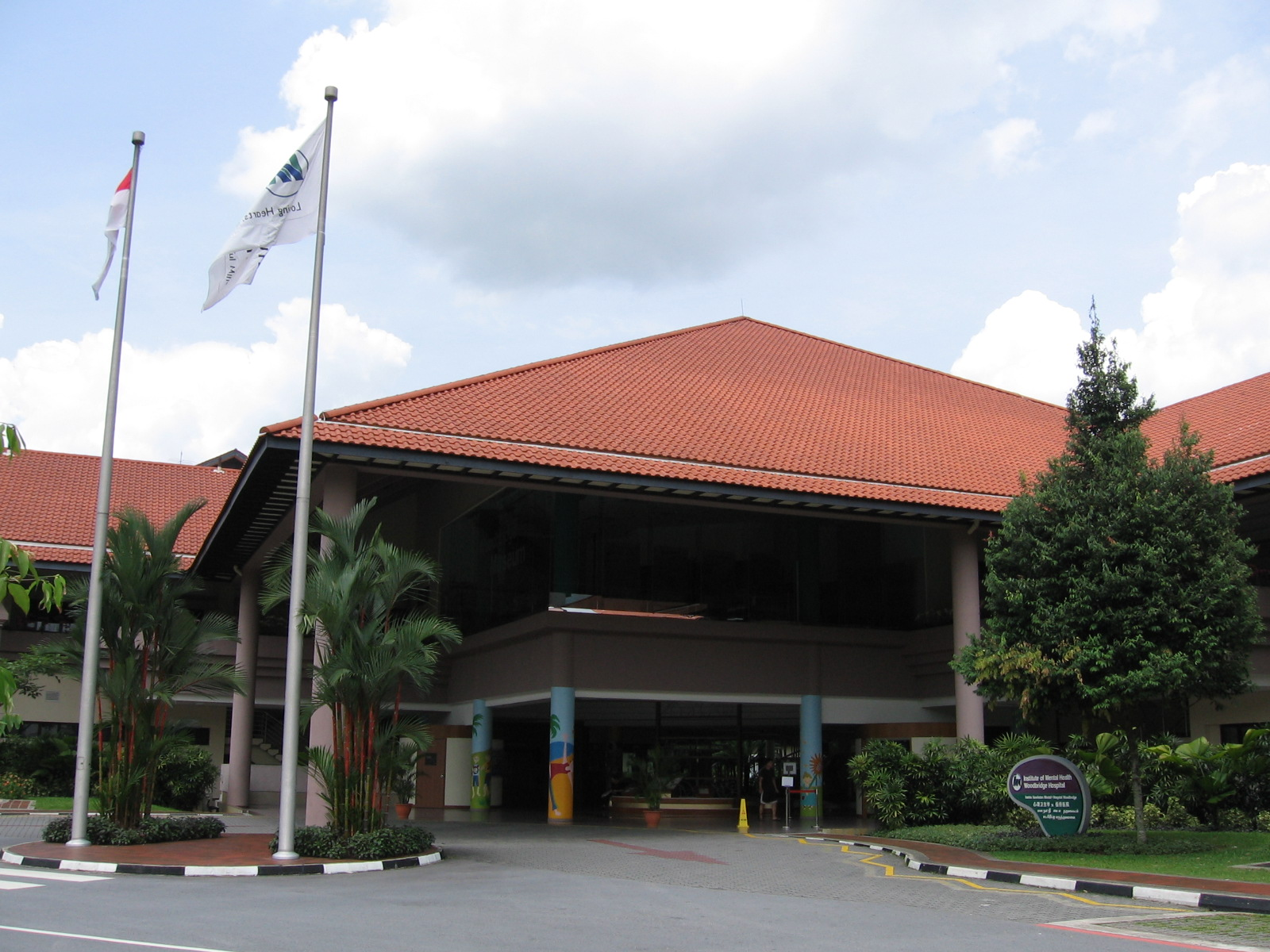
- Institute of Mental Health at Buangkok, Hougang, Singapore.

Geography
- Location: 10 Buangkok View, Buangkok Green Medical Park, Singapore 539747, Singapore
- Coordinates: 1.3818°N 103.8825°E

Organisation
- Type: Specialist

Services
- Beds: 2000
- Speciality: Psychiatric hospital

History
- Founded: 1841; 185 years ago (as The Insane Hospital); 1887; 139 years ago (as The New Lunatic Asylum); 1928; 98 years ago (as The Mental Hospital); 1951; 75 years ago (as Woodbridge); 1993; 33 years ago (as Institute of Mental Health)

Links
- Website: www.imh.com.sg
- Lists: Hospitals in Singapore

The Institute of Mental Health (IMH), formerly known as Woodbridge Hospital, is a psychiatric hospital in Hougang, Singapore.

IMH is the only tertiary hospital in Singapore that specialises in psychiatry. It has more than 50 wards and 2,010 beds for inpatients and seven specialist clinics for outpatients. Apart from its hospital-based services, IMH runs satellite clinics at different locations in Singapore and executes community mental healthcare programmes.

== History ==
The earliest psychiatric facility in Singapore was a 30-bed building at the corner of Bras Basah Road and Bencoolen Street in 1841. It was then known as the Insane Hospital. It was renamed the Lunatic Asylum in 1861 and moved to a site near the old Kandang Kerbau Maternity Hospital. In 1887, the hospital relocated to the New Lunatic Asylum, with a capacity for 300 patients, built at College Road. In 1928, a 24-ward Mental Hospital was built along Yio Chu Kang Road. The New Lunatic Asylum and another psychiatric ward at Pasir Panjang were closed down and 1,030 patients were transferred to the Mental Hospital.

Spread out over 80 hectares of land, the Mental Hospital was then the largest medical facility in Singapore providing custodial care for the mentally ill, with a capacity for 1,400 patients. In the 1920s, caring for the mentally ill was mainly custodial in nature. Patients were segregated from the community and were cared for by a handful of expatriate nurses with the help of health attendants who were not trained in nursing.

After Singapore surrendered to the Japanese in 1942, about 700–800 seriously wounded civilian casualties were transferred from the General Hospital to the Mental Hospital, which was transformed into the Japanese Civilian and Military Hospital. The Japanese transferred about 500 'quieter' mental patients to St John's Island, where many starved to death. The remaining 1,000 were locked up and neglected, of which about 600 were transferred in 1944 to the Central Mental Hospital, Tanjung Rambutan, in Perak, Malaysia. Of these 600, after the war, only 329 returned.

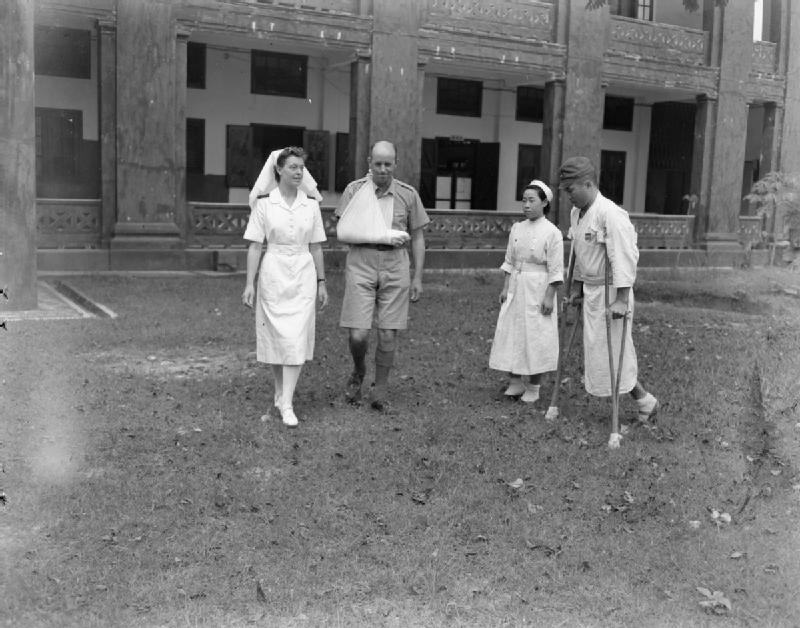
British and Japanese patients, accompanied by nurses, take exercise in the grounds of 81 Mobile Field Hospital.

For a brief period from 1945 to 1947, the British Royal Air Force from the nearby Seletar Airfield requisitioned the hospital for use to treat the sick and wounded of Allied servicemen and Japanese POWs after the end of World War II. The female section was converted into the RAF Hospital while the male section became the Japanese Prisoners of War Hospital. The hospital was known as the 81 Mobile Field Hospital until its return to civilian usage in 1947. The hospital was the first Royal Air Force hospital established after the Japanese surrender.

In 1946, the Mental Hospital was returned to its original function, housing some 440 mental patients. In 1951, to reduce some of the stigma associated with mental illness, the hospital was renamed Woodbridge Hospital. This name was derived from the local Chinese name for the hospital area—'Pang Kio' ('Wooden Bridge') — as there was a wooden bridge in the hospital vicinity in Yio Chu Kang.

By 1958, Woodbridge Hospital had accommodation for 2,000 patients. The Psychiatric School of Nursing was set up in 1954. In 1955, a social work department was formed as well as an improved occupational therapy service. Psychological services were started in 1956 and V.W. Wilson, the first clinically trained psychologist in Singapore, was contracted from the United Kingdom by the Colonial Medical Service to incorporate a psychological service within the mental health programme.

A Child Guidance Clinic was opened in 1970. This grew to become the Child Psychiatric Clinic, which also provided family therapy. A Community Psychiatric Nursing programme was set up in 1988 and psychiatric nurses conducted home visits to provide care, support and follow-up for patients within the community.

Up to 1981, psychiatry trainees were sent to the UK to train for the MRCPsych qualification. After 1983, Woodbridge, began to train its own psychiatrists in collaboration with the NUS medical school. The first locally trained Master of Medicine trainee in Psychiatry graduated in 1985.

In 1984, the Ministry of Health mooted the idea of a new psychiatric hospital to evolve from a largely custodial care model to one of community care for the benefit of the people. The prevention, early treatment and rehabilitation of clients with mental conditions would actively operate within the community as opposed to late treatment within an institution that isolates them from everyday life, making reintegration into the community difficult.

Plans were put in place for a very different hospital that would change mental healthcare in Singapore with further emphasis on training and new initiatives in mental health promotion and clinical research.

Woodbridge moved to its present 25-hectare premises in Hougang in 1993. With the move, it was reorganised and renamed the Institute of Mental Health Hospital to reflect its added commitment to research and training.

IMH became the first mental health institution in Asia to receive Joint Commission International Accreditation in 2005, an international accreditation of healthcare organisations. Besides providing clinical services, IMH coordinates and oversees education of clinicians, nurses and allied health professionals in psychiatry and conducts research related to mental health.

In 2006, the Institute of Mental Health compound was marked as Singapore's 83rd historic site by the National Heritage Board due to its history as Singapore's first mental institution.

It also plays a key role in developing capability in community agencies, such as family service centres, to enable staff to support persons with mental health problems in the community.

The Woodbridge Museum which showcases the journey of mental healthcare in Singapore is also located at IMH.

== Community-Based Services ==
In 2007, the National Mental Health Blueprint was established by the Ministry of Health (MOH). With a reinvestment fund of $88 million over 5 years, its objective was to develop national capability in mental health services. IMH initiated a number of community-based programmes as part of the Blueprint, targeted at the three main population segments—children, adults and the elderly.

- Response, Early intervention and Assessment in Community mental Health (REACH). REACH is a community-based mental health service which works with schools, community agencies and family doctors to help students with mental disorders.
- Community Health Assessment Team (CHAT). CHAT is a national youth mental health programme that enables youths to seek help for emotional and mental health issues. Its aims are to raise awareness of youth mental health and provide a free, confidential assessment service. CHAT also conducts school programmes.
- Community Mental Health Team (CMHT). The CMHT comprises doctors, community psychiatric nurses, and allied health specialists and provides community-based treatment and psycho-social rehabilitation of our patients, integrating them into the community whilst in recovery.
- Aged Psychiatry Community Assessment Treatment Service (APCATS). APCATS is a community-based psychogeriatric clinical service which provides assessment and treatment for homebound or frail elderly patients with mental disorders. APCATS comprises geriatric psychiatrists, medical officers, psychologists, geriatric psychiatric nurses, occupational therapists, physiotherapists, and medical social workers. The team also makes home visits to patients.

== Research ==
The key focus areas of research at IMH are mental health policy research and translational clinical research.

Key research spearheaded by IMH include:

- Psychiatric Epidemiology: Singapore Mental Health Study, Well-being of the Singapore Elderly Study
- Singapore Translational Clinical Research in Psychosis : Identification of Biomarkers of Schizophrenia and related psychoses
- Neurocognition in Serious Mental Illness
- Neuroimaging
- Clinical Trials in Schizophrenia, Autism, ADHD, Addiction
- Health Service Research in Mental Health

In March 2022, IMH embarked on a nationwide epidemiological study – Well-being of the Singapore Elderly (WiSE) – that aims to establish high-quality data of the burden of dementia and depression among the elderly in Singapore and to bridge the knowledge gap on the associated risk factors, healthcare use and economic impact. The data collection for the study would continue till July 2023. This study is a collaboration with international and local research investigators from various Singapore hospitals as well as from King's College London.

== List of chief executive officers ==
- Luisa Lee: 1993 – 1999
- Kua Ee Heok: 1999 – 2002
- Leong Yew Meng: 2002 – 2011
- Chua Hong Choon: 2011 – 2021
- Daniel Fung: 2021 – 2026
- Jamie Mervyn Lim: 2026 – present

== Recognition and awards ==
In 2006, IMH's Early Psychosis Intervention Programme won the World Health Organization State of Kuwait Prize for Research in Health Promotion.

In 2011, IMH clinched the inaugural Grand Award for the Hospital of the Year, at the Asian Hospital Management Awards organised by Hospital Management Asia. The award recognises and honours hospitals in Asia that carry out best practices.

In 2012, the Institute of Mental Health earned the Accreditation with Distinction from the American Nurse Credentialing Center (ANCC), for its nursing education, becoming the only institution outside the US to receive this recognition.

== Bibliography ==
- IMH Link (Periodical published by The institute)
- Loving Hearts, Beautiful Minds: 75th Anniversary. Institute of Mental Health, Woodbridge Hospital. Armour Pub. 2003. ISBN 978-981-4138-07-9.
- Ng, Beng Yeong (2001). Till the break of day: a history of mental health services in Singapore, 1841 - 1993. Singapore: Singapore University Press, National University of Singapore. ISBN 978-9971-69-245-2.
