= SingHealth =

Group of healthcare institutions in Singapore

Singapore Health Services

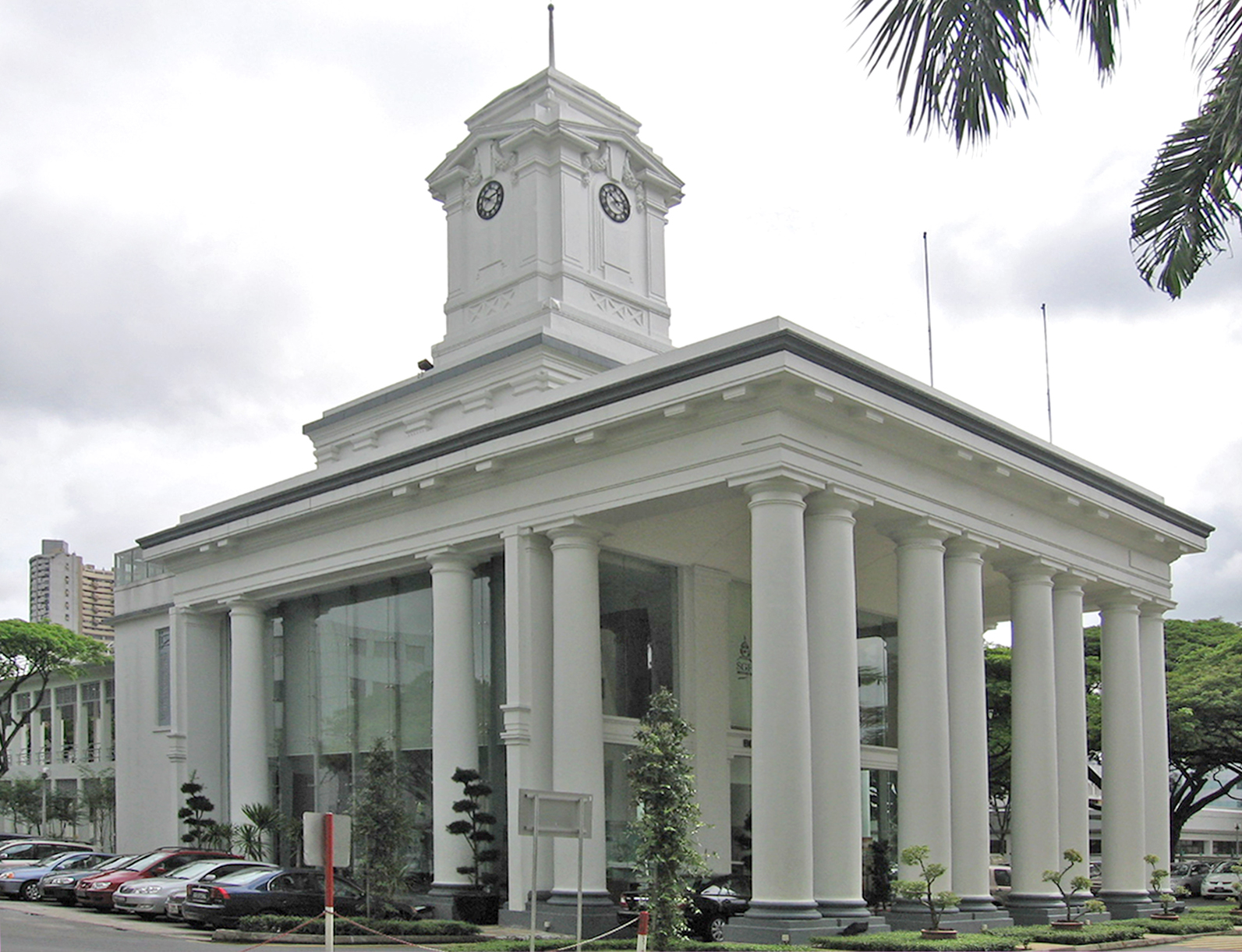
- Bowyer Block of Singapore General Hospital, the oldest and largest hospital in the SingHealth group
- Formation: 1 April 2000; 26 years ago
- Registration no.: 53143018M
- Owner: Ministry of Health
- Chairman: Cheng Wai Keung
- Group CEO: Ng Wai Hoe
- Parent organization: MOH Holdings Pte. Ltd.
- Website: www.singhealth.com.sg

Singapore Health Services, commonly known as SingHealth, is the largest group of healthcare institutions in Singapore. Established in 2000, the group consists of four public hospitals, two community hospitals, five national specialty centres and a network of eight polyclinics. The Singapore General Hospital (SGH) is the largest hospital in the group and serves as the flagship hospital for the cluster.

== History ==
In November 1999, then-Minister for Health Lim Hng Kiang announced that Singapore's public healthcare institutions would be reorganised into two delivery networks, or clusters. In October 2000, the formation of the two clusters - National Healthcare Group and SingHealth - was officially completed.

On 3 November 2009, Singapore General Hospital and SingHealth Group, both launched the inaugural issue of Singapore Health – a newspaper reporting on health-related matters affecting Singaporeans.

On 18 November 2011, Changi General Hospital left SingHealth and formed the Eastern Health Alliance along with St. Andrew's Community Hospital, SingHealth Polyclinics and The Salvation Army Peacehaven Nursing Home.

On 20 January 2017, SingHealth announced that it would be merging with the Eastern Health Alliance, bringing Changi General Hospital back into the SingHealth cluster.

== Organisation ==
=== Polyclinics ===
SingHealth operates SingHealth Polyclinics, a network of primary care polyclinics largely situated in the southeast, east, and northeast of Singapore. These polyclinics provide primary care services to the population in these areas, and also provide training for family medicine physicians.

=== General hospitals ===
- Singapore General Hospital is a 1,785-bed tertiary hospital (as of 2017) in Outram. It was founded in 1821, and is the largest and oldest hospital in Singapore. Its campus also includes several other specialty centres as well as Outram Polyclinic.
- KK Women's and Children's Hospital is an 830-bed women and children-only hospital in Kampong Java. It was founded 1858 as a small general hospital, but then specialized as a maternity hospital and later added pediatric services. It is the largest hospital in Singapore dedicated to women's and children's healthcare.
- Changi General Hospital is a 1,000-bed regional hospital in Simei. It was founded in 1998 to serve patients in the east and northeast of Singapore. In 2011, it left SingHealth to form the Eastern Health Alliance with other healthcare institutions in the area, but in 2017 merged back with SingHealth.
- Sengkang General Hospital is a 1,000-bed regional hospital in Sengkang. It was founded in 2012 to serve patients in northeast of Singapore and to alleviate the patient load of Changi General Hospital. It initially trialed operations in Alexandra Hospital and later moved to its current campus in 2018. It is co-located with Sengkang Community Hospital.

=== National specialty centres ===
The national specialty centres of SingHealth are located in the Singapore General Hospital Outram campus, with the exception of the National Neuroscience Institute which is also co-located in the Tan Tock Seng Hospital Novena campus.

==== Singapore National Eye Centre ====
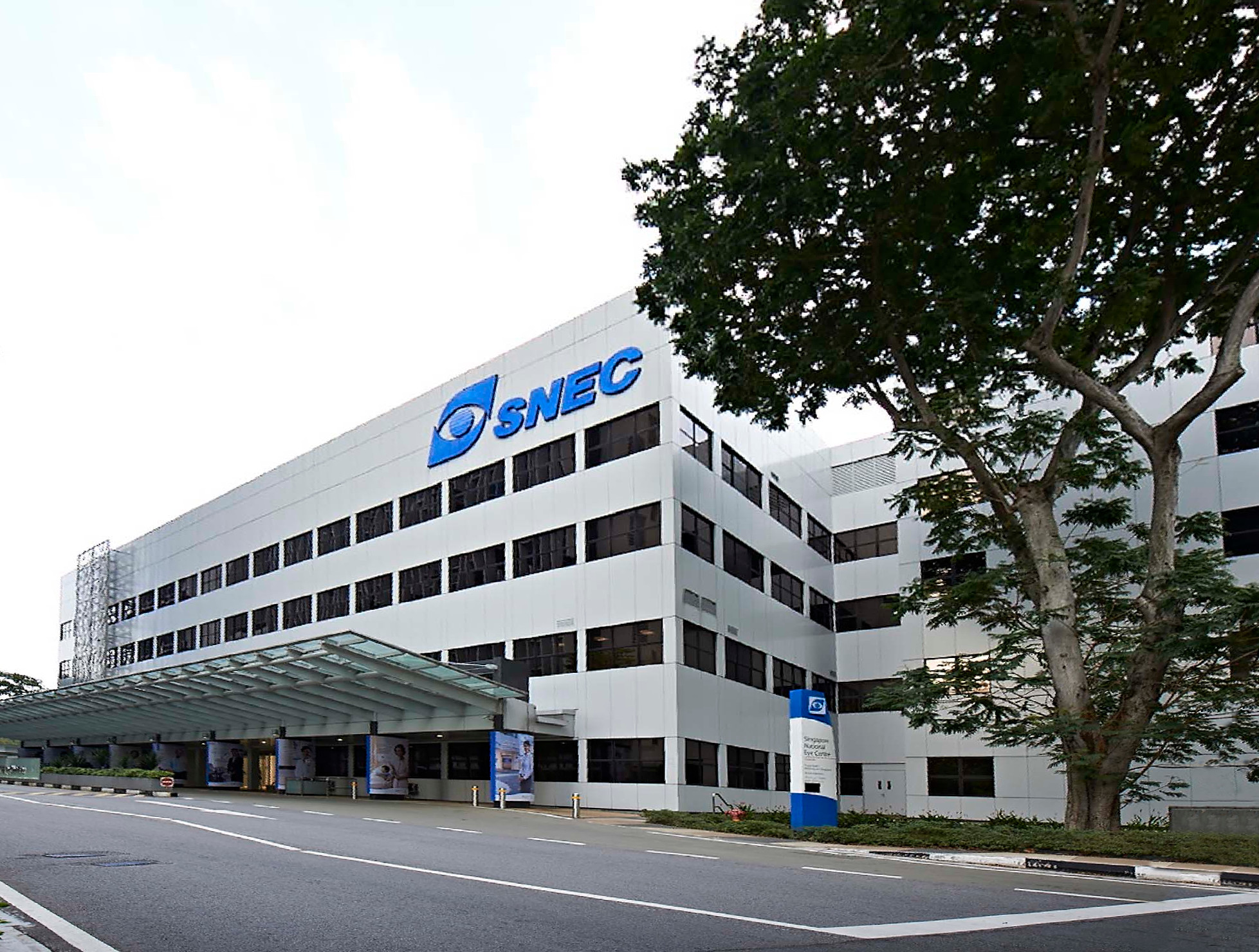
Singapore National Eye Centre

The Singapore National Eye Centre (SNEC) is a specialty centre for ophthalmological services within the public health sector. Aside from clinical services in ophthalmology, the centre also provides education and research services, with its faculty of nearly 80 ophthalmologists. The Singapore Eye Research Institute (SERI) was established as the centre's research arm for eye and vision research.

SNEC manages more than 380,000 patient visits and over 41,000 surgeries annually, many of these are tertiary and complex in nature. The centre's full spectrum of subspecialties addresses every part of the eye – Corneal & External Eye Disease, Cataract & Comprehensive Ophthalmology, Glaucoma, Neuro-Ophthalmology, Ocular Inflammation & Immunology, Oculoplastic, Paediatric Ophthalmology & Adult Strabismus, Refractive Surgery, and Medical & Surgical Retina.

SNEC adopts a multi-subspecialty approach to treating complex eye conditions, as such disorders require strategic management with other disciplines. The centre undertakes 100% video recording of major surgeries and a full audit of outcomes, as well as the pursuit of high-impact translational research (known as clinical-focused research).

==== National Cancer Centre Singapore ====
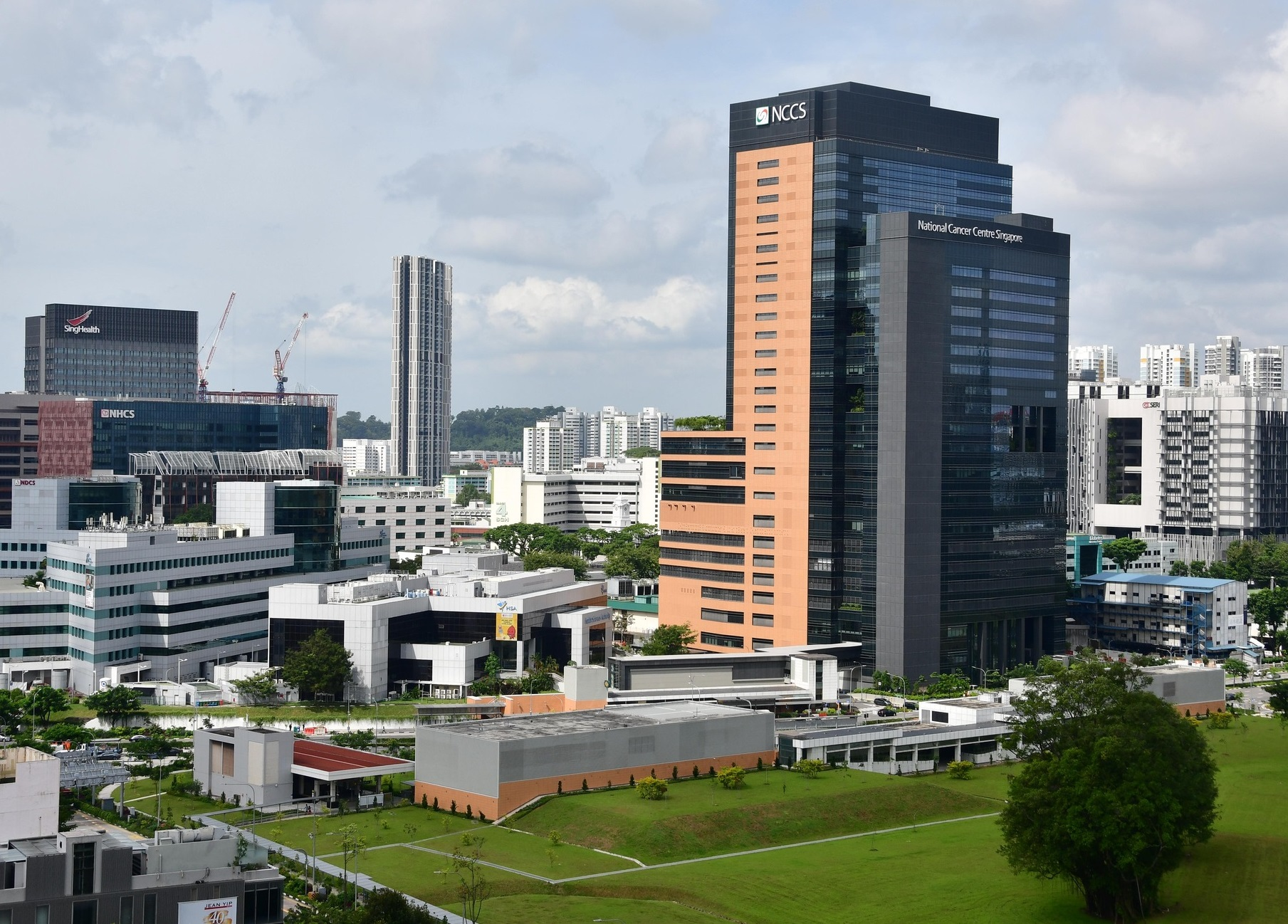
National Cancer Centre Singapore

The National Cancer Centre Singapore (NCCS) is a national and regional tertiary cancer centre.

To meet growing healthcare needs, the new NCCS building opened in 2023 with increased capacity and expanded facilities dedicated to cancer care, rehabilitation, research and education.

==== National Heart Centre Singapore ====
The National Heart Centre Singapore (NHCS) is a specialist medical centre in Singapore for cardiac problems as well as a regional referral centre for cardiovascular diseases. Established in 1994 as the Singapore Heart Centre in the Singapore General Hospital, it was renamed in 1998. The heart centre took over the hospital's cardiac services and set up a cardiology laboratory in 1995. In 2014, the NHCS completed its move to its new purpose-built building within the Singapore General Hospital Outram Campus at 5 Hospital Drive, Singapore 169609. The new building not only includes facilities for outpatient clinics and non-invasive testing, but also has operating theatres and an invasive cardiac catheterisation laboratory.

With over 9,000 inpatient admissions every year, the 186-bed specialty centre for cardiovascular disease in Singapore offers treatments from preventive to rehabilitative cardiac services.

==== National Dental Centre Singapore ====
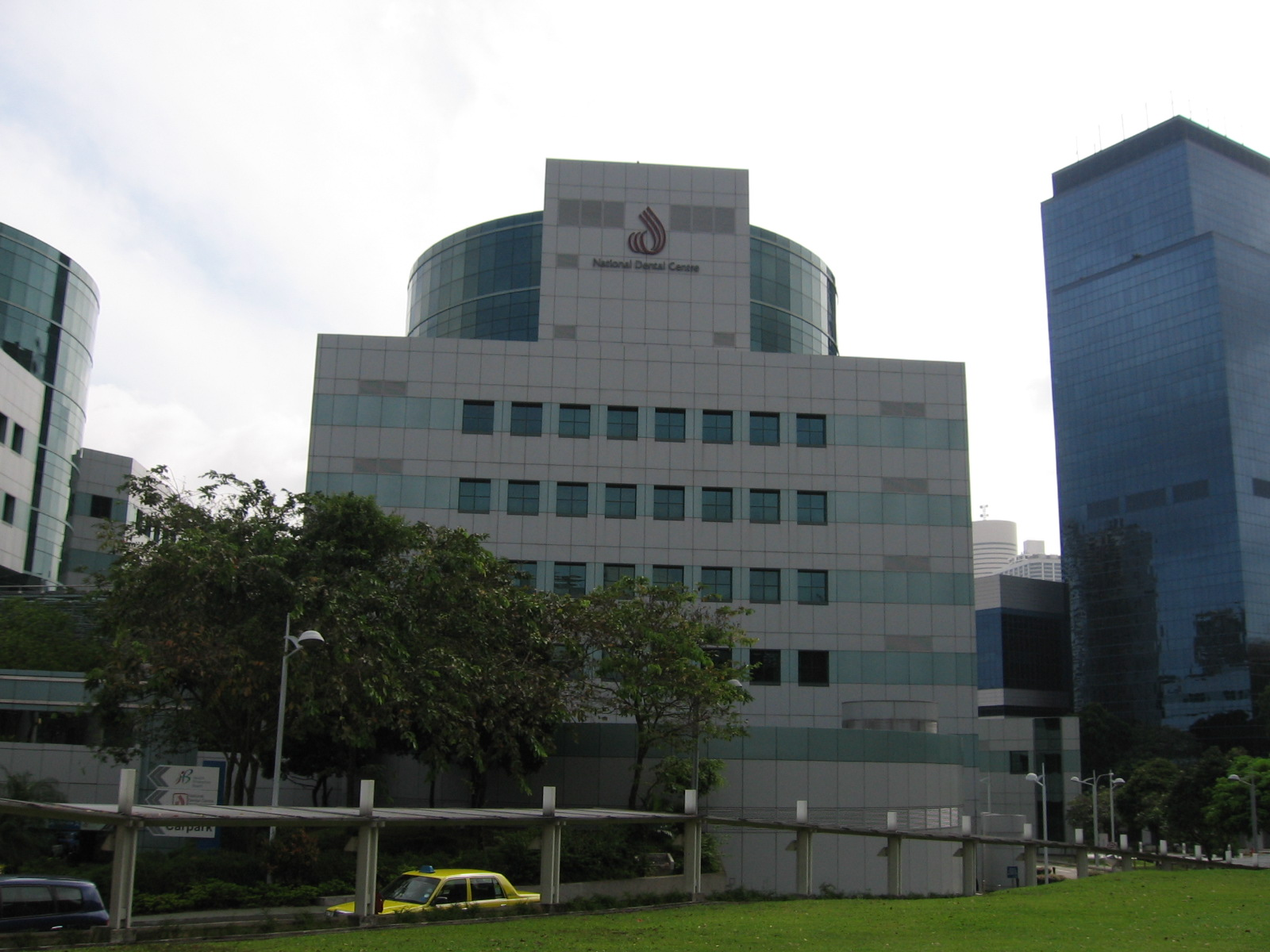
National Dental Centre Singapore

The National Dental Centre Singapore (NDCS) is a facility in Singapore for specialist oral healthcare services. It commenced operations on 1 March 1997 and claims to offer the largest concentration of specialist expertise in a single facility. The Centre's specialist teams attend to over 700 patients daily, including walk-in patients and those being referred to the centre. The Centre is equipped with 92-chair facility and a day surgery suite.

The Centre has three specialist clinical departments, Oral and Maxillofacial Surgery, Orthodontics and Restorative Dentistry, which attend to a wide range of oral conditions. The Endodontics, Pediatric Dentistry, Periodontics and Prosthodontics services are sub-units within the Department of Restorative Dentistry. Multidisciplinary sub-speciality services are available through the NDC's Centres for Corrective Jaw Surgery, Maxillofacial Rehabilitation and Facial Pain.

The Centre is active in research as well as training, focusing especially on the professional education of dentists. NDCS has been being managed by Singapore Health Services Pte Ltd since 2002 and is located within the Singapore General Hospital Outram campus.

==== National Neuroscience Institute ====
The National Neuroscience Institute (NNI) is the national and regional specialty centre for the management and care of neurological diseases in Singapore, providing treatment for a broad range of illnesses that affect the brain, spine, nerves and muscles. As a national and international centre of excellence in the neurosciences, its mission and goals are — patient care, research and education. The NNI's Neurology, Neurosurgery and Neuroradiology services provide care in these fields not only in Singapore but throughout the region.

The establishment of the NNI in 1999 resulted in the transfer of the departments of Neurology and Neurosurgery from Tan Tock Seng Hospital (TTSH) to form a new clinical service. A new department of Neuroradiology was also set up to provide specialized diagnostic imaging and interventional services for neurological diseases. The NNI now has a campus co-located with SGH in Outram, but — unlike other SingHealth specialty centres — also has a campus alongside Tan Tock Seng Hospital in Novena, Singapore, and also provides specialty services to most other hospitals in Singapore.

=== Community hospitals ===
- Outram Community Hospital is a community hospital in Outram. It is co-located with Singapore General Hospital.
- Sengkang Community Hospital is a community hospital in Sengkang. It is co-located with Sengkang General Hospital.

== Incidents ==
=== 2018 data breach ===
Personal particulars of 1.5 million SingHealth patients and records of medicines dispensed to 160,000 outpatients, were stolen in a cyberattack occurring between 27 June and 4 July 2018. Information relating to the names, National Registration Identity Card numbers, addresses, dates of birth, and race and gender of patients who visited specialist outpatient clinics and polyclinics between 1 May 2015 and 4 July 2018 was maliciously accessed and copied. Information relating to patient diagnosis, test results and doctors' notes were unaffected. Information on Prime Minister Lee Hsien Loong was specifically targeted.

== Donations ==
In January 2026, SingHealth received a $135 million in donation from the Estate of Khoo Teck Puat to advance medical research and personalised healthcare. This is the largest single donation to a public healthcare institution in Singapore.

== See also ==
- NHG Health
- National University Health System
