= Healthcare in Singapore =

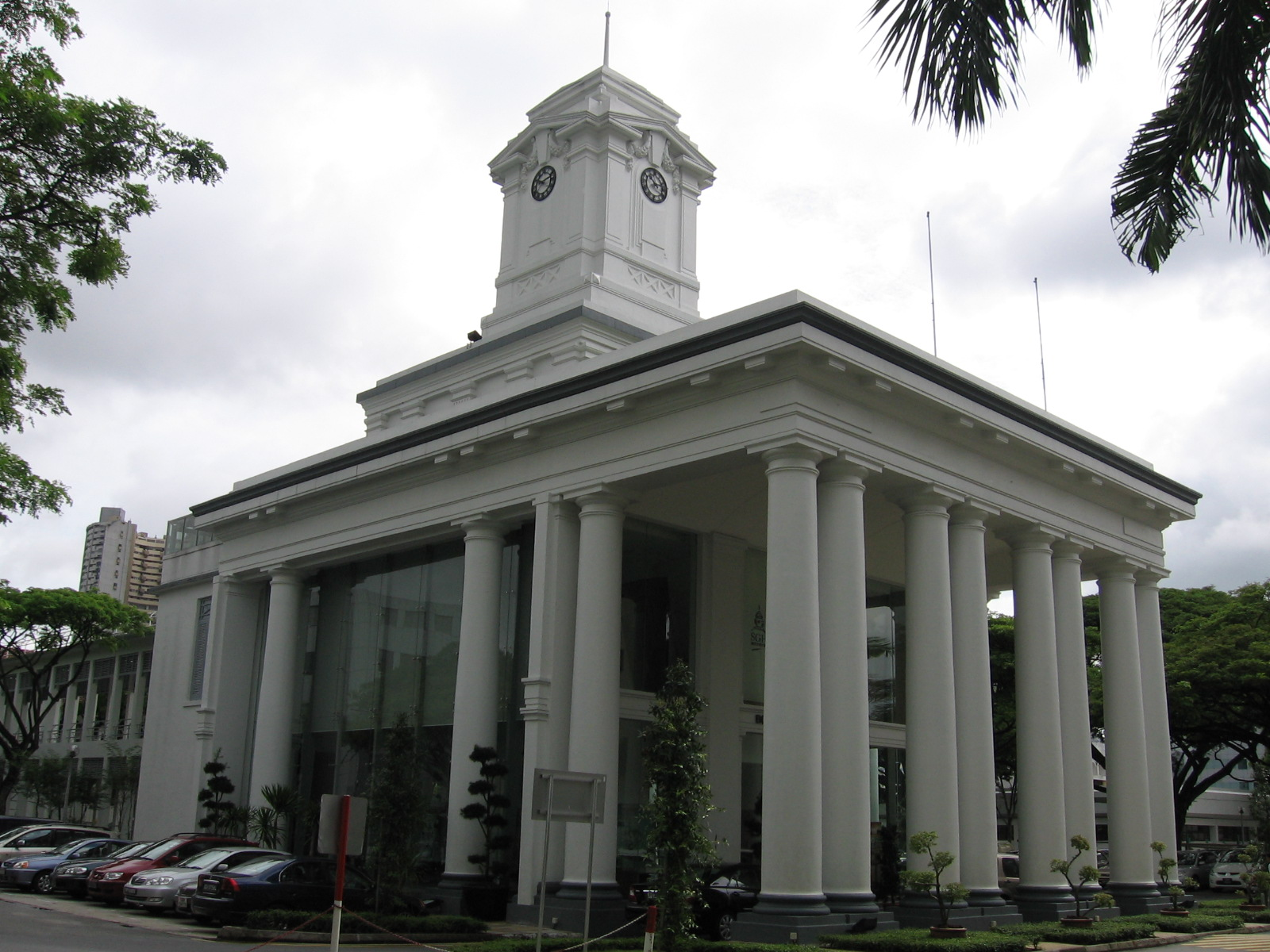
The Bowyer Block at the Singapore General Hospital now houses the SGH Museum which was officially opened in May 2005.

Healthcare in Singapore is under the purview of the Ministry of Health of the Government of Singapore. It mainly consists of a government-run publicly funded universal healthcare system as well as a significant private healthcare sector. Financing of healthcare costs is done through a mixture of direct government subsidies, compulsory comprehensive savings, national healthcare insurance, and cost-sharing.

The Singaporean public health insurance system is based on programs run by the Central Provident Fund, primarily Medisave, a mandatory medical savings account scheme. All working citizens and permanent residents are obligated to set aside a portion of their income into Medisave accounts, which they can draw upon to pay their own medical bills and those of their immediate family. The Central Provident Fund also manages the MediShield and MediFund insurance schemes, which cover people with insufficient savings or those who have depleted their savings. In addition, the government provides subsidies for the medical expenses of citizens and permanent residents who receive treatment in public hospitals.

Singapore generally has an efficient and widespread system of healthcare. In 2000, Singapore was ranked 6th in the World Health Organization's ranking of the world's health systems. Bloomberg ranked Singapore's healthcare system the most efficient in the world in 2014. The Economist Intelligence Unit placed Singapore 2nd out of 166 countries for health-care outcomes. Bloomberg Global Health Index of 163 countries ranked Singapore the 4th healthiest country in the world and first in Asia.

Development of life expectancy in Singapore

As of 2019, Singaporeans have the world's longest life expectancy, 84.8 years at birth. Women can expect to live an average of 87.6 years with 75.8 years in good health. The averages for men are lower, with a life expectancy at 81.9 years with 72.5 years in good health.

According to global consulting firm Towers Watson, Singapore has "one of the most successful healthcare systems in the world, in terms of both efficiency in financing and the results achieved in community health outcomes". For the most part, the government does not directly regulate the costs of private medical care. These costs are largely subject to market forces, and vary enormously within the private sector, depending on the medical specialty and service provided.

== History ==
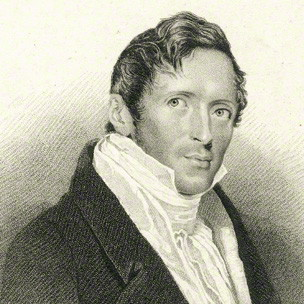
Sir Stamford Raffles brought along a single doctor named Thomas Prendergast in Feb 1819 — by most accounts accepted as the time when Western medicine first arrived on the island.

=== Early colonial years ===
Stamford Raffles arrived in Singapore in January 1819, with a single accompanying doctor, a sub-assistant surgeon named Thomas Prendergast, then the medical officer in Penang's General Hospital. After a treaty was signed allowing the British East India Company to set up a trading post in Singapore, Prendergast oversaw the newly established post's medical needs until William Montgomerie arrived and served as Singapore's first surgeon. Prendergast, as a military doctor, was put in charge of the first General Hospital on the island — a small shed erected near the junction of Bras Basah Road and Stamford Road in 1821.

Singapore in the early colonial years was a poorly funded trading post with severe budget constraints due to Raffles' commitment to keep it as a free port, which meant that the administration was not able to raise funds through customs duties. This made health care substantially more difficult to provide for in this new but bustling port. Diseases such as cholera, smallpox, enteric fevers, typhoid and venereal diseases were common. Even the General Hospital building, which was supposed to be an "elite" healthcare institution in the early days, had to be replaced twice by 1830 because it was "dilapidated and full of holes".

== Healthcare providers ==
The healthcare system in Singapore is divided into two sectors; statutory boards and institutions (which are then divided into public and private streams). There are a variety of statutory boards in place, including the Medical Council, Dental Council, Nursing Board, Pharmacy Council, and Optometrists and Opticians Board. Healthcare institutions can be divided into public and private hospitals and healthcare providers. All hospitals in Singapore have been structured as government corporations since the 1990s, constantly competing with one another to have the most advanced services, and technology available. There are multiple spheres and levels to both the public and private streams.

== Public health system ==
Since the 1990s, all public hospitals, polyclinics, and specialty centres have been restructured as government-owned corporations, and operate under three healthcare groups or "clusters":

1. National Healthcare Group
2. National University Health System
3. SingHealth

The 11 public hospitals comprise 9 general hospitals (AH, SGH, NUH, CGH, TTSH, KTPH, NTFGH, SKH & WH), and 2 specialized hospitals (KKH and IMH).

As of 2019, Singapore had a total of 14,297 doctors in its healthcare system, giving a doctor-to-population ratio of 1:399. The nurse-to-population ratio (including midwives) was 1:133, with a total of 42,777 nurses. There were 2,475 dentists, giving a ratio of 1 dentist to 2,304 people.

Approximately 70–80% of Singaporeans obtain their medical care within the public health system. Overall government spending on public healthcare amounts to 1.6% of annual GDP. As of 2013, this amounted to an average of $1,104 Government Health Expenditure per person. Health-related spending is the third largest expenditure item, after defence and education expenses. As the median age of the population increases, Singapore's healthcare spending is expected to rise. Healthcare spending has risen from $4 billion in 2011 to $9.8 billion in 2016.

Singapore has a strong reputation for health services and healthcare systems; in 2000, the country was ranked sixth in the world by the World Health Organization. Public hospitals have autonomy over management decisions, and compete with one another for patients. General hospitals have a variety of functions and services; they mainly represent multi-disciplinary acute inpatient and specialist outpatient services, have 24-hour emergency centers, and often specialize in a specific field of medicine (cancer research, neuroscience, dental care, cardiac care, etc.). Singapore has an array of hospitals and health services available, as well as community hospitals that exist as an intermediate form of healthcare for people who do not require the services of a general hospital but cannot cope at home. The funding behind Singapore's public health sector can be broken down into the Ministry of Health of Singapore, MediSave, MediShield Life, and MediFund.

=== Emergency Medical Services ===
Emergency medical services (EMS) in Singapore are provided by the Singapore Civil Defence Force (SCDF). SCDF operates a fleet of ambulances, "fast response paramedics" on motorcycles as well as first response fire-bikers. SCDF is characterised as a nationally funded, multi-tiered, fire-based EMS system. SCDF responded to 150,155 calls in 2013, of which 96.1% were classified as emergency calls.

== Financing ==
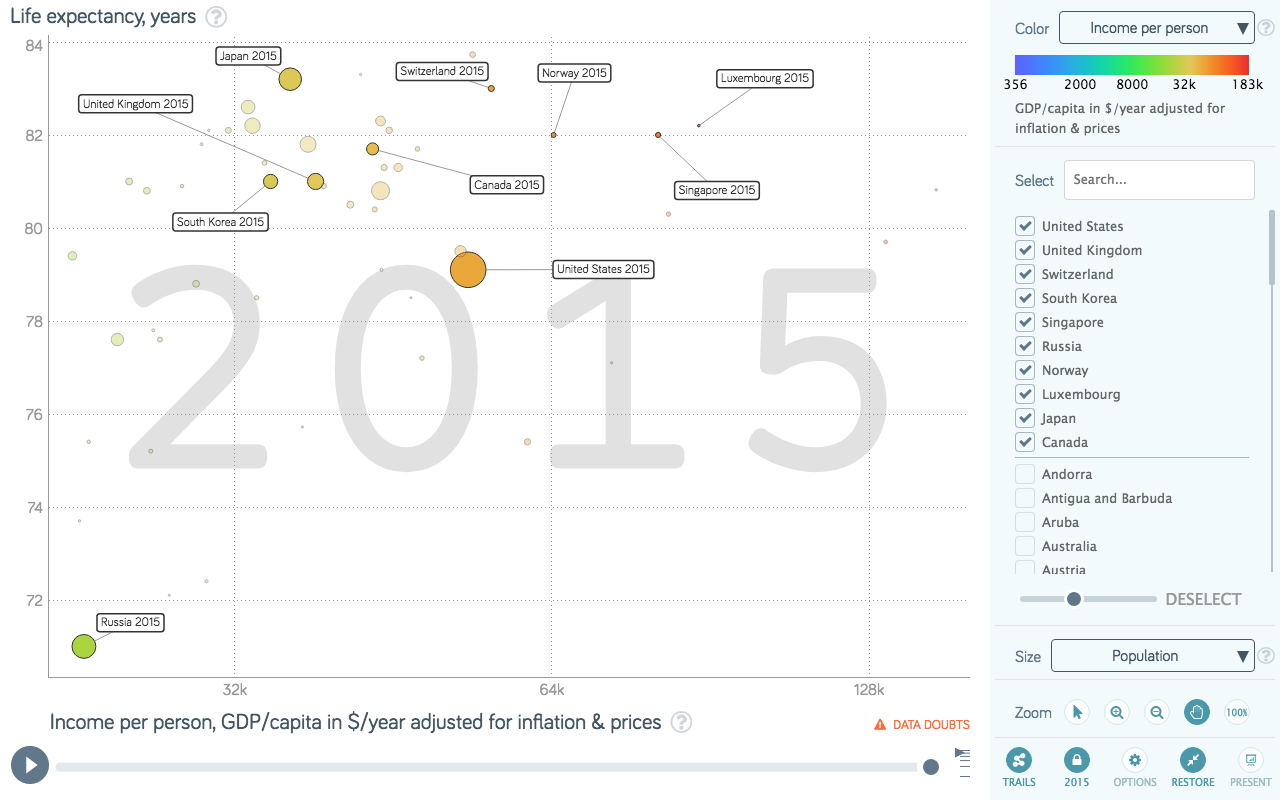
Comparison of income per person and life expectancy for some countries in 2015

Singapore's healthcare system uses a mixed financing system that includes nationalised life insurance schemes and deductions from the compulsory savings plan, or the Central Provident Fund (CPF), for working Singaporeans and permanent residents. This mechanism is intended to reduce the overuse of healthcare services.

=== MediSave ===
MediSave is a medical savings account under an individual's CPF account that is used for payment of future medical expenses as well as premiums of medical insurance policies. Funds can be pooled within and across an entire extended family.

The Central Provident Fund Board, a social security system, allows the citizens of Singapore to put aside funds for a variety of expenses including retirement, healthcare and mortgage. Citizens can make monthly contributions to three different accounts: 1) ordinary accounts for housing, insurance, investment, and education, 2) special accounts for retirement, and investment, and 3) MediSave accounts for hospitalisation expenses and medical insurance. MediSave contributions are usually between 8-10.5% of an individual's wage, and is capped at a $52,000 limit. This form of a health savings account is required by all workers; those below the age of 55 are required to deposit 20% of their earnings. This contribution is partly matched by the employer who contributes 17% of the workers earnings.

=== MediShield Life ===
Launched in 1990, MediShield is a low cost basic insurance scheme intended for those whose savings are insufficient to meet their medical expenses. Premiums can be paid out of MediSave accounts. A new scheme, MediShield Life, replaced the MediShield in November 2015. Co-insurance payment rates are to be reduced from 10 to 20% to 3–10% and the lifetime claim limit is to be removed. The scheme helps to pay for hospital bills and selected outpatient treatments. The government provides premium subsidies to lower- to middle-income residents, the elderly and new policyholders transitioning from cheaper policies.

The Integrated Shield Plan (IP) includes both the MediShield Life component and an additional private insurance coverage component run by private insurers, to cover for optional benefits in public hospitals and private hospitals. Premiums for the IP can be paid by the MediSave funds. As on 16 February 2021, 7 private insurers - AIA, AXA, Great Eastern, Income, Prudential, Raffles Health and Singlife are authorized by Ministry of Health to offer Integrated Shield plans to the consumers.

In September 2020 it was announced it was being considered that treatment for drug addiction, alcoholism and injuries from attempted suicide would be covered under MediShield Life.

=== CareShield Life ===
ElderShield is a severe disability insurance scheme which insures against the cost of private nursing homes and related expenses. Since 2002, members with a CPF MediSave account will automatically be enrolled in the scheme at the age of 40, unless they choose to opt out. Three private insurers, Great Eastern, Income and Singlife were chosen to manage ElderShield. The Ministry of Health will run ElderShield from 2021 on a not-for-profit basis, taking over from the three private insurers. This arrangement will allow a smoother upgrade to CareShield Life. It has 1.2 million policyholders as of 2015, with $2.6 billion collected in premiums, and around $100 million in payout claims and $130 million in premium rebates between 2002 and 2015.

=== MediFund ===
MediFund is Singapore's safety net programme, which covers only the lowest class of hospitalisation fees and services. This form of coverage and insurance is only available to citizens of Singapore once they have depleted their MediSave and MediShield funds. The amount of funding and coverage is dependent on the individuals' income, health condition, and socioeconomic status.

It is a government endowment fund for those who are unable to meet their assessed contribution. Risks are not pooled, so an individual may be exposed to catastrophic expenses. A total of $155.2 million was allocated to patients in 2015.

=== Subsidies ===
Singapore citizens and Permanent Residents warded in public hospitals receive government subsidies for their medical fees, which scale according to their chosen category of ward as well as their income. Since 1 January 2009, patients warded in B2 and C class wards in public hospitals undergo means testing to determine the level of subsidy they are entitled to, based on the average monthly income received over the last available 12-month period including bonuses for salaried employees. However, patients receiving services such as Day Surgery, A&E services, Specialist Outpatient and polyclinic visits receive standardised subsidies regardless of income without requiring means testing.

People with no income, such as retirees or housewives, will have their subsidy rate pegged to the value of their homes, whereas all unemployed residents of HDB flats excluding those in executive condominiums (EC) will be entitled to the highest tier of subsidy.

The following table details the subsidies available:

Means testing in public hospitals as of 1 January 2009
Average Monthly Income of Patient (SGD)	Citizens Subsidy		Permanent residents Subsidy	
Average Monthly Income of Patient (SGD)	Class C	Class B2	Class C	Class B2
$3,200 and below^{1}	80%	65%	70%	55%
$3,201 – $3,350	79%	64%	69%	54%
$3,351 – $3,500	78%	63%	68%	53%
$3,501 – $3,650	77%	62%	67%	52%
$3,651 – $3,800	76%	61%	66%	51%
$3,801 – $3,950	75%	60%	65%	50%
$3,951 – $4,100	74%	59%	64%	49%
$4,101 – $4,250	73%	58%	63%	48%
$4,251 – $4,400	72%	57%	62%	47%
$4,401 – $4,550	71%	56%	61%	46%
$4,551 – $4,700	70%	55%	60%	45%
$4,701 – $4,850	69%	54%	59%	44%
$4,851 – $5,000	68%	53%	58%	43%
$5,001 – $5,100	67%	52%	57%	42%
$5,101 – $5,200	66%	51%	56%	41%
$5,201 and above^{2}	65%	50%	55%	40%
1. No income declare and property with AV below $11,000.; 2. No income declare and property with AV exceeding $11,000.; 3. Foreigners no longer receive any subsidies at public hospitals since 01-Jan-08.

== Community Health Assist Scheme ==
In 2012, the Community Health Assist Scheme or CHAS was introduced. It is a supplementary healthcare scheme that provides further subsidies for citizens from lower-to-middle income households, and the Pioneer generation, born before 1950, who need treatment for common illnesses, chronic health problems and specific dental issues. Beneficiaries get a blue or orange "Health Assist Card", depending on their household income.

In 2019, the scheme was extended. Orange cardholders who only received subsidies for chronic conditions now also get subsidies for common illnesses. All citizens are covered for chronic conditions, and the subsidies for complex chronic conditions have been further increased.

== Private sector ==
The increasingly large private sector provides care to those who are privately insured, foreign patients, or public patients who are able to afford what often amounts to very large out-of-pocket payments above the levels provided by government subsidies. The private sector consists of private healthcare, and private insurance. The private healthcare sector utilizes the network of General Practitioners (GPs) and Private Hospitals. And, the private health insurance sector utilizes Integrated Shield plans and private insurance.

The government uses the capacity of the private sector to reduce waiting times in the public sector. In 2015 it planned to use the Raffles Medical Group to receive non-critical ambulance cases.

=== Private healthcare ===
The private healthcare sector in Singapore has a large market, with a more exclusive clientele. Private healthcare often attracts individuals in search of more advanced and complicated treatments such as stem cell therapy, or specialised cancer treatments. Private healthcare is more appealing and preferred by expatriate citizens as opposed to public for the short wait times, and greater availability of services.

Two hospital groups operate the majority; Parkway Pantai and Raffles Medical Group. These private hospitals are typically smaller, offer patients more privacy, and typically specialize in certain procedures or surgeries.

==== Parkway Pantai ====
Parkway Pantai is Southeast Asia's largest private healthcare provider with hospitals in several countries such as Singapore, Malaysia and Brunei. It is a wholly owned subsidiary of IHH Healthcare and owns four hospitals in Singapore: Gleneagles Hospital, Mount Elizabeth Hospital, Mount Elizabeth Novena Hospital and Parkway East Hospital.

==== Raffles Medical Group ====
Raffles Medical Group (RMG) is one of the largest private healthcare providers in Asia, with hospitals and clinics located in several cities, including Singapore. RMG owns Raffles Hospital in Singapore, which specializes in obstetrics and gynecology, cardiology, oncology, and orthopedics.

=== Private health insurance ===
There are a variety of choices for private health insurance in Singapore, known as Integrated Shield Plans which supplement Medishield Life coverage. Depending on an individual, or families level of income, lifestyle, location, and medical history, there are monthly insurance plans ranging from S$75 SGD to S$400. Companies include but are not limited to AIA, AXA, Great Eastern, Income, Prudential, Raffles Health and Singlife.

== Government initiatives ==
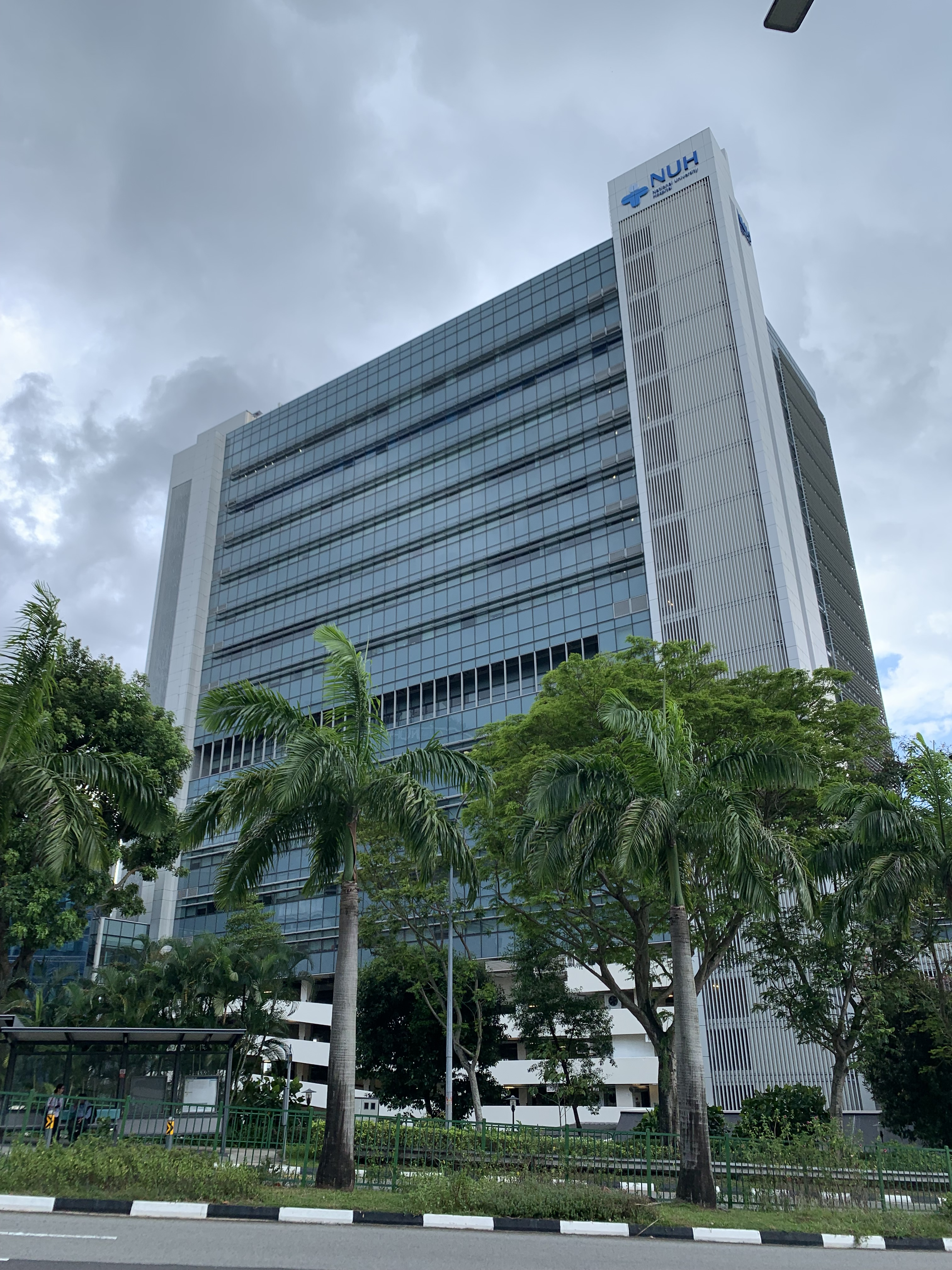
National University Hospital in 2025

=== Medical tourism ===
In October 2003, then acting Minister for Health Khaw Boon Wan launched "SingaporeMedicine" to promote Singapore as a regional medical hub. He said more than 200,000 foreigners visited Singapore for its medical services in 2002 and that the Economic Review Committee reaffirmed its ambition of serving 1 million foreign patients annually by 2012. In his speech, Khaw said,

"SingaporeMedicine that we are launching today shall be the rallying point and a powerful symbol of our collective will and commitment towards this ambition...

In three specialties alone, heart, eye and cancer, I see tens of millions of middle-class patients within a 7-hour flying radius, waiting to be served. If they can be attracted here, they will keep us all very busy...

This is my dream for Singapore as the regional medical hub, where regional doctors and nurses compete to work here to learn, and where international patients seek us out for care and treatment."

=== National Electronic Record Programme ===
The National Electronic Record Programme was launched in 2011 and is used by more than 280 institutions to support telehealth and telemedicine.

=== Pioneer Generation Package ===
The Pioneer Generation Package (PGP) is a S$9 billion package launched in 2014 aimed at helping approximately 450,000 Singaporeans born on or before 31 December 1949 and obtained citizenship before 31 December 1986 through a series of healthcare and social support schemes over an estimated 20-year period.

== Issues ==
=== Shortage of hospital beds ===
Since 2010, the healthcare system has often faced shortages of hospital beds. This has been attributed to an ageing population, especially affected by the COVID-19 pandemic. In certain situations, hospitals had to temporarily locate patients in other places or being transferred to community care facilities.

Since then, the government has opened three general hospitals and three community hospitals to cater to the increasing demand for hospital beds, and temporary hospitals were and are being built at Changi, Jurong East, Sengkang, Yishun, Bedok and Pasir Ris.

== See also ==
- Health in Singapore
- List of hospitals in Singapore
- Mental health in Singapore
- Napier Healthcare
- Singaporean measures against avian influenza
