= Temasek Foundation =

Singapore-based non-profit organization

Temasek Foundation International
- Type: Foundation (nonprofit)
- Founded: May 2007
- Founders: Temasek Holdings
- Headquarters: Singapore
- Area served: Asia
- Key people: Goh Geok Khim (Chairman); Benedict Cheong (CEO)
- Products: Grants
- Services: Health care, Education, Public administration and Disaster-response capability
- Website: Temasek Foundation

Temasek Foundation International is a Singapore-based non-profit organisation under the philanthropic arm of the Singapore state sovereign fund Temasek Holdings. Temasek has established 17 endowments since 1974, focused on promoting social and cultural interaction, education, and aid for the disadvantaged in Asia.

It is under the financial oversight of Temasek Trust, the endowment trustee of Temasek Holdings. The other foundations under the Trust's financial oversight include Temasek Foundation Cares, Temasek Foundation Connects, Temasek Foundation Nurtures, Temasek Foundation Innovates, and Temasek Foundation Ecosperity.

As of 2016, over S$2 billion has been given to community initiatives covering a wide range of sectors and demographic groups, both locally and regionally, benefitting more than 300,000 people in Singapore and across Asia.

== History ==
Temasek was formed in 1974 following the amalgamation of some 35 companies previously owned by the Singaporean Ministry of Finance. This was done following the government’s decision to commercialise former British naval and military zones.

The government had been left with these zones in the wake of the British announcement to withdraw from Singapore in 1967, which was then promptly adjusted to 1971. At the 40th anniversary of Temasek in 2014, then President of Singapore,Tony Tan Keng Yam spoke of the Singaporean government’s decision to do this, saying: “It was clearly not the business of government to run such enterprises, and so Temasek was set up to take over and own some 35 companies and miscellaneous investments.”

In 2003, Temasek instituted a policy of setting aside a share of its excess returns for the community for each year Temasek exceeded its risk-adjusted cost of capital.

In 2007, the Temasek Trust was established to provide financial oversight for and governance of Temasek's endowment gifts to its non-profit Philanthropic Organisations (NPPOs). This allowed their NPPOs to focus on the implementation and management of its social and community programmes.

In 2016, Temasek was restructured into six foundations, in an attempt to reaffirm its ongoing commitment to the wider community in Singapore and beyond.

Also in 2016, Temasek established the Temasek Philanthropic Platform, reaffirming its ongoing commitment to the wider community in Singapore and beyond, and signaling the next phase of its community investment journey. The platform comprises the Temasek Trust, the Temasek Family of Six Foundations and Temasek Foundation Management Services.

== Temasek Family of Six Foundations ==
The Temasek Family of Six Foundations comprises

1. Temasek Foundation International
2. Temasek Foundation Cares
3. Temasek Foundation Connects
4. Temasek Foundation Nurtures
5. Temasek Foundation Innovates
6. Temasek Foundation Ecosperity

=== Temasek Foundation International ===
Formerly (before 6 September 2016) known as Temasek Foundation (TF), Temasek Foundation International is a Singapore-based non-profit philanthropic organisation that engages communities, enables partners and supports programmes to Build People in Health Care, Build People in Education, Build Bridges Between Peoples, Build Institutions of Excellence and Rebuild Lives & Livelihoods Affected by Natural Disasters.

Temasek Foundation International also manages the Singapore Technologies Endowment Programme (STEP).

As of March 2016, Temasek Foundation has had 30,145 direct participants, connected with 183,142 people (through learning sessions conducted by trained programme participants) and benefited 4,980 families who were recipients of Temasek Foundation International's post-disaster recovery provisions.

==== Programmes ====
===== Healthcare =====
The foundation has launched nursing management programmes in China (Tianjin) and India (West Bengal and Karnataka), Health Care Management programmes in India (Tamil Nadu) and Sri Lanka, and Public Health Care programmes in Lao PDR.

===== Education =====
Temasek Foundation International supports the enhancing of adaptable educational policies, practices and curriculum through education leaders. This is further accomplished through supporting programmes that train leaders, educators, and specialists to build capabilities in education in schools, vocational institutions, and technical colleges and universities. As of FY2015/16, Temasek Foundation International has launched 109 education programmes, including those in China (Jilin and Sichuan), Indonesia, Mongolia, Thailand, Vietnam, Cambodia and Indonesia.

===== Cultural exchange =====
Temasek Foundation International aims to integrate a community of diverse regions, languages, cultures, and faiths by supporting networking platforms for students, leaders and opinion-shapers from different countries to converge to learn, share experiences and build upon the diversity of cultures.

It has launched 52 cross-cultural education programmes as of 2015.

Temasek Foundation International also held the inaugural Temasek Foundation Asia Leaders Connect, its first leadership forum for Asian senior officials, where 25 leaders from Bhutan, Cambodia, India, Indonesia, Lao PDR, Philippines, Sri Lanka, and Thailand gathered to discuss the public sector management and global challenges affecting Asia.

===== Urban development =====
Temasek Foundation International sponsors economic development, urban development, and public administration education programmes. It has launched Urban Management programmes in India (Delhi and Maharashtra), Myanmar, and Asia-wide, and Public Administration programmes in Cambodia, Indonesia, Lao PDR, Malaysia, the Philippines, and other Asian regions

===== Disaster aid =====
The foundation supports communities struck by disaster through disaster-preparedness capability programmes and post-disaster rehabilitation efforts.

During FY2013/14, Temasek Foundation International trained 430 medical specialists and community health responders in disaster medical management to better respond to emergencies in the eventuality of disasters in the Sulawesi region, Indonesia.^{7} It also provided medical, health, and community kits including nutrition-related provisions to those affected by Typhoon Haiyan through the Philippine Red Cross and Singapore Red Cross Society in Tacloban, Philippines.

Singapore Technologies Endowment Programme (STEP) was set up as a Charity and IPC in 1997. STEP's programmes focus on social and cultural activities, leadership, environment, and innovation, to help youth in Asia build goodwill and understanding. Initiatives under STEP include the Sunburst Youth Camp, Sunburst Brain Camp and Sunburst Environment Programme. These programmes provide youth with opportunities to connect and understand each other, further igniting their passion for neuroscience, innovation and the environment.

=== Temasek Foundation Cares ===
As of 31 March 2016, Temasek Foundation Cares has funded and supported 95 programmes, benefitting 29,000 people. The beneficiaries include people with disabilities, those in need of psychological support, children with learning and developmental needs, abused women and children, single parents, needy families, and elderly persons who require long term care. Programmes under the Temasek Emergency Preparedness Fund have also touched the lives of 1.2 million households.

Under Temasek Foundation Cares, the S$75 million Temasek Emergency Preparedness (T-PREP) Fund is dedicated to enhancing community emergency resilience and preparedness.

==== Programmes ====
===== An Inclusive Future of Us =====
This programme was Temasek Cares’ signature SG50 event that honed the primary aim to engage special needs persons by building an inclusive Singapore community. 5,300 children with special needs and their caregivers participated in ‘The Future of Us’ exhibition held at Gardens by The Bay. The event created public awareness of the need to build an inclusive community that involves people with disabilities.

===== Stay Prepared – Trauma Network for Children =====
Building on the success of the Temasek Cares KITS programme, Stay Prepared aims to enhance community-based resources to adequately provide psychosocial trauma support for children and families in schools and in the community. It equips community-based organisations and schools who serve children with trauma-specific skills and links them together in a trauma learning network.

===== Balaji Sadasivan – Healthcare Building Capability Project =====
Set up in 2010, the Balaji Sadasivan – Healthcare Building Capability Project aims to build manpower capability in the Intermediate and Long-Term Care sector to meet the needs of Singapore's ageing population. Since its inception, 38 study awards have been given to students in the fields of occupational therapy, physiotherapy, nursing, and health services management. In FY2015/16 alone, 10 study awards were given.

===== Ee Peng Liang – Special Needs Building Capability Project =====
With a growing demand for early intervention services for persons diagnosed with special needs, the Ee Peng Liang (Special Needs Building Capability Project) was set up in 2011 to create skilled manpower to serve people with developmental, intellectual, physical, sensory, or multiple disabilities. Since 2011, 41 study awards have been given to individuals with the passion and aptitude to serve in this sector.

==== Grants ====
Rather than funding beneficiaries directly or independently running programmes and services, Temasek Foundation Cares partners with non-profit organisations and supports their developing and running of programmes that align with Temasek Foundation Cares’ purpose and mission.

As at 2016: Temasek Foundation Cares has given $9.8 million in programme grants across 13 programmes to 71,500 beneficiaries: 65,000 of which fall under the Temasek Emergency Preparedness Fund and 6,500 of which benefited from the Balaji Sadasivan, Ee Peng Liang, and Temasek Cares Endowments.

==== S Rajaratnam Endowment ====
The S Rajaratnam Endowment (SRE) is a S$100 million endowment set up by Temasek in 2010, in conjunction with the 45th anniversary of Singapore's independence, to recognise Singapore's first Foreign Minister and one of Singapore's pioneering leaders.

SRE seeks to achieve development, peace and stability by deepening international friendships, promoting regional cooperation and fostering greater and common understanding of international rules, based on the twin pillars of good governance and sustainability.

==== Hon Sui Sen Endowment ====
The Hon Sui Sen Endowment (HSSE) develops future public service leaders in the financial industry in Singapore and Asia, fostering fellowship and exchange among them.

Its flagship programme, the Temasek Regional Regulators Scholarship (TRRS) builds and develops the capabilities of talents from regional central banks and financial regulatory institutions, while promoting stronger networks and relationships among Asian financial regulatory institutions.

=== Temasek Foundation Innovates ===
Temasek Foundation Innovates is a Singapore-based non-profit philanthropic organisation that funds and supports programmes focused on developing practical solutions for a better life through research and innovation.

Established in 2016, it aims to strengthen research capabilities by nurturing talents, as well as encouraging multi-disciplinary programmes and inter-agency collaboration for collective capabilities. The Foundation manages two endowments - the Singapore Millennium Foundation and Temasek Life Sciences Laboratory.

==== Singapore Millennium Foundation ====
The Singapore Millennium Foundation (SMF) was set up as a charity and IPC in 2001 by the then Singapore Technologies Pte Ltd (STPL). Since 2011, it has been a Temasek Trust-supported non-profit organisation that promotes research through the awarding of post graduate research scholarships and funding of research programmes in the areas of ageing, palliative care, pedagogy and learning, special needs education, and non-medical bio-science. Its ethos is promoting research as an endeavour to help humanity.

More than 200 post graduate research scholarships have been awarded as at 2010. These scholarships supported clinician scientists in their research. A number of SMF scholars have attained faculty positions in local Universities and/or continued their research at universities and research institutes locally and abroad.

In 2010, the SMF discontinued its scholarship schemes and channeled its funds to support smaller, more niche research programmes in Singapore. Some supported research programmes include Liver Cancer, Parkinson Disease, Neuromuscular Disease, Bio-fuel and Mental Health.

In 2011, SMF initiated grant calls to researchers from NUS, NTU, NIE and other selected research institutes. To date, research grants have been awarded in Pedagogy and Learning/Special Needs Education, Ageing, Palliative Care, and Non-Medical Bio-Science.

A second grant call inviting more research proposals in these areas was launched in December 2012. There have been five grant calls since, with a sixth grant call in progress.

==== Temasek Life Sciences Laboratory ====
Temasek Life Sciences Laboratory (TLL) is a research institute established in 2002 that undertakes bio-molecular science research and applications to benefit people. It is a beneficiary of Temasek Trust and an affiliate of the National University of Singapore and the Nanyang Technological University.

With approximately 240 researchers of 21 different nationalities, TLL's primary focus lies in understanding the cellular mechanisms that underlie the development and physiology of plants, fungi and animals. Such research provides new understanding of how organisms function and a foundation for biotechnology innovation.

TLL has an international network of partnerships and hopes to benefit the development of the biotechnology industry in Singapore through collaborations and joint research ventures with local and international partners.

Research:

TLL's current research interests lie in cell biology, developmental biology, neuroscience, pathogenesis, and bioinformatics. Utilizing a range of molecular and cell biology approaches, and computational data mining, TLL focuses primarily on understanding the cellular mechanisms that underlie the development and physiology of plants, fungi and animals. This research provides new understanding of how organisms function and also provides the foundation for biotechnological innovation.

Research Groups:

- Cell Biology
- Developmental Biology
- Genome Structural Biology
- Molecular Pathogenesis
- Adjunct Appointments
- Former Research Groups

PhD/Graduate Programme:

TLL offers an intensive PhD program to prepare the next generation of scientists for exciting careers in the life sciences. Through the program, students regularly publish in the most prestigious research journals and travel widely to present their work at international conferences. All successful applicants receive a fellowship that includes a living stipend.

Research Attachment Programme:

TLL supports training programmes organized by other local institutions on top of running its own training programmes. These training programmes are jointly funded by NUS and TLL. This eight-week programme is conducted at TLL once a year from November to December.

=== Temasek Foundation Ecosperity ===
Temasek Foundation Ecosperity is a Singapore-based non-profit philanthropic organisation that funds and supports strategic and impact-driven programmes focused on championing the sustainability of the global ecosystem and the development of innovative solutions to improve liveability.

Established in 2016, it aims to bring about enduring solutions, systems and capabilities against environmental, biological and other adversities in Singapore and beyond. It also strives to develop and nurture a vibrant ecosystem for innovation and entrepreneurship, as well as promote sustainable best practices and standards.

Temasek Foundation Ecosperity has supported the development and engineering of the AIR+ Smart Mask and Airbitat Smart Cooler.

==== AIR+ Smart Mask ====
In 2013, Temasek and ST Engineering piloted the AIR+ Smart Mask project to provide N95 protection to Singapore communities, in particular children, from the harmful effects of haze.

It has the world's first attachable and rechargeable micro ventilator that extracts moisture, carbon dioxide, and heat trapped within the mask for better comfort. With the micro ventilator, it is able to reduce relative humidity inside the face mask by up to 40% and reduce temperature by up to 4°C.

==== Airbitat Smart Cooler ====
The Airbitat Smart Cooler was developed by Innosparks, an ST Engineering subsidiary, to provide outdoor cooling in Singapore (down to around 24°C) in an environmentally sustainable way. It is the world's first energy-efficient evaporative cooling system with only 20% the energy consumption of an average air conditioner – making it ideal for commercial, industrial, and recreational spaces.

== See also ==
- Temasek Cares
- Other NPPOs
