= CPG Corporation =

Singaporean architectural and engineering consultancy firm

- Formerly: Public Works and Convicts; Public Works Department of Singapore; PWD Corporation
- Type: Private
- Industry: Infrastructure and building development
- Founded: 1833; 193 years ago in Singapore, Straits Settlements
- Founder: George Drumgoole Coleman
- Headquarters: Singapore
- Area served: Worldwide
- Key people: Tan Shao Yen (President and Group Chief Executive Officer) Tan Cheng Chuah (Deputy Group Chief Executive Officer) Charlotte Lian (Deputy Group Chief Executive Officer)
- Services: Architectural Design Adaptation to Climate Change Civil & Structural Engineering Construction Management Decarbonisation Development Advisory Environment Engineering Facilities Management Green Design Infrastructure Engineering Interior Design Landscape Design Mechanical & Electrical Engineering Project Management Quantity Surveying Transportation Engineering Urban Planning & Design Wastewater Treatment
- Number of employees: 1,500 (2025)
- Parent: Temasek Holdings (1999–2003); Downer EDI Group (2003–2012); China Construction Technology Consulting Co. Ltd (2012–present)
- Subsidiaries: Construction Professionals Pte Ltd CPG Consultants Pte Ltd CPG Facilities Management Pte Ltd CPG International Pte Ltd CPG Signature Pte Ltd PM Link Pte Ltd
- Website: www.cpgcorp.com.sg

CPG Corporation (CPG) is a Singapore-based multidisciplinary consultancy that provides integrated services in architecture, engineering, infrastructure design, and facilities management. Headquartered in Singapore, the company operates through 11 overseas offices with a business presence in over 30 countries.

CPG’s work focuses on sustainable and resilient design, urban infrastructure, and the application of technology in the built environment. The firm’s projects span sectors including transportation, healthcare, education, and civic developments, both in Singapore and internationally.

== History ==
The Public Works and Convicts Department was formed in 1833 after George Drumgoole Coleman became the first superintendent. The department was formally established as the Public Works Department of Singapore (PWD) in 1946.

Under Temasek Holdings, it was incorporated in 1999 and renamed to PWD Corporation before again being renamed to CPG Corporation in 2002. A year later, it became part of the Downer EDI Group.

In 2012, the ownership of the CPG Corporation group of companies was transferred from Downer EDI, Australia, to China Architecture Design and Research Group.

== List of CPG projects in Singapore ==
- Ayer Rajah Expressway, Singapore
- Benjamin Sheares Bridge, Singapore
- Bukit Timah Expressway, Singapore
- Cavenagh Bridge, Singapore
- Central Expressway, Singapore
- Central Fire Station, Singapore
- Changi Airport, Terminals 1, 2, 3, Singapore
- Changi Water Reclamation Plant, Singapore
- Chek Jawa Visitor Centre, Singapore
- Duke-NUS Graduate Medical School, Singapore
- East Coast Lagoon Food Village, Singapore
- Esplanade Theatres on the Bay, Singapore
- Gardens by the Bay, Singapore
- INTERPOL Global Complex for Innovation, Singapore
- Khoo Teck Puat Hospital, Singapore
- Kranji Expressway, Singapore
- Lorong Halus Wetland, Singapore
- Malay Heritage Centre, Singapore
- Mandai Crematorium and Columbarium, Singapore
- Marina Coastal Expressway, Singapore
- Nanyang Technological University The Hive, Singapore
- National Centre for Infectious Diseases and Centre for Healthcare Innovation, Singapore
- National Gallery Singapore, Singapore
- National Museum of Singapore, Singapore
- Ng Teng Fong General Hospital and Jurong Community Hospital, Singapore
- NTU School of Art, Design and Media, Singapore
- NUS Tahir Foundation Building, Singapore
- Old Hill Street Police Station, Singapore
- Pan Island Expressway, Singapore
- Pasir Ris Sports and Recreation Centre, Singapore
- Raffles Institution, Singapore
- Singapore Botanic Gardens, Singapore
- Singapore Parliament House, Singapore
- Singapore Racecourse, Singapore
- Solaris @ one-north, Singapore
- State Courts Towers, Singapore
- Sungei Buloh Wetland Reserve, Singapore
- Treasure Island Bungalows, Singapore
- Tan Tock Seng Hospital, Singapore
- Tanjong Rhu Footbridge, Singapore
- The Rochester, Singapore
- Victoria School, Singapore
- Woodlands Checkpoint, Singapore

== List of CPG projects overseas ==
- ADB Headquarters, Philippines
- Amity International School, UAE
- Bình Dương Administrative Centre, Vietnam
- Cam Ranh Airport International Terminal, Vietnam
- Da Nang International Airport, Vietnam
- Eco Botanic, Malaysia
- Eco Summer, Malaysia
- Eco Terraces, Malaysia
- Emirates Financial Towers, Dubai, UAE
- GEMS World Academy, Dubai, UAE
- Hazrat Shahjalal International Airport, Bangladesh
- Indus Academic Medical Campus, Pakistan
- Islamabad International Airport, Islamabad, Pakistan
- Khartoum International Airport, Sudan
- Kunshan Western District Medical Centre, China
- National Diagnostic Centre, Maldives
- Setia Sky 88, Malaysia
- Seychelles International Airport, Seychelles
- Sheraton Hotel and Condominium, Shunde, China
- Sky 8 Condominium, Malaysia
- Tianjin Baoding Bridge, China
- Xiamen Zhongshan Park Station, China
