= Jurong Community Hospital =

- National University Health System
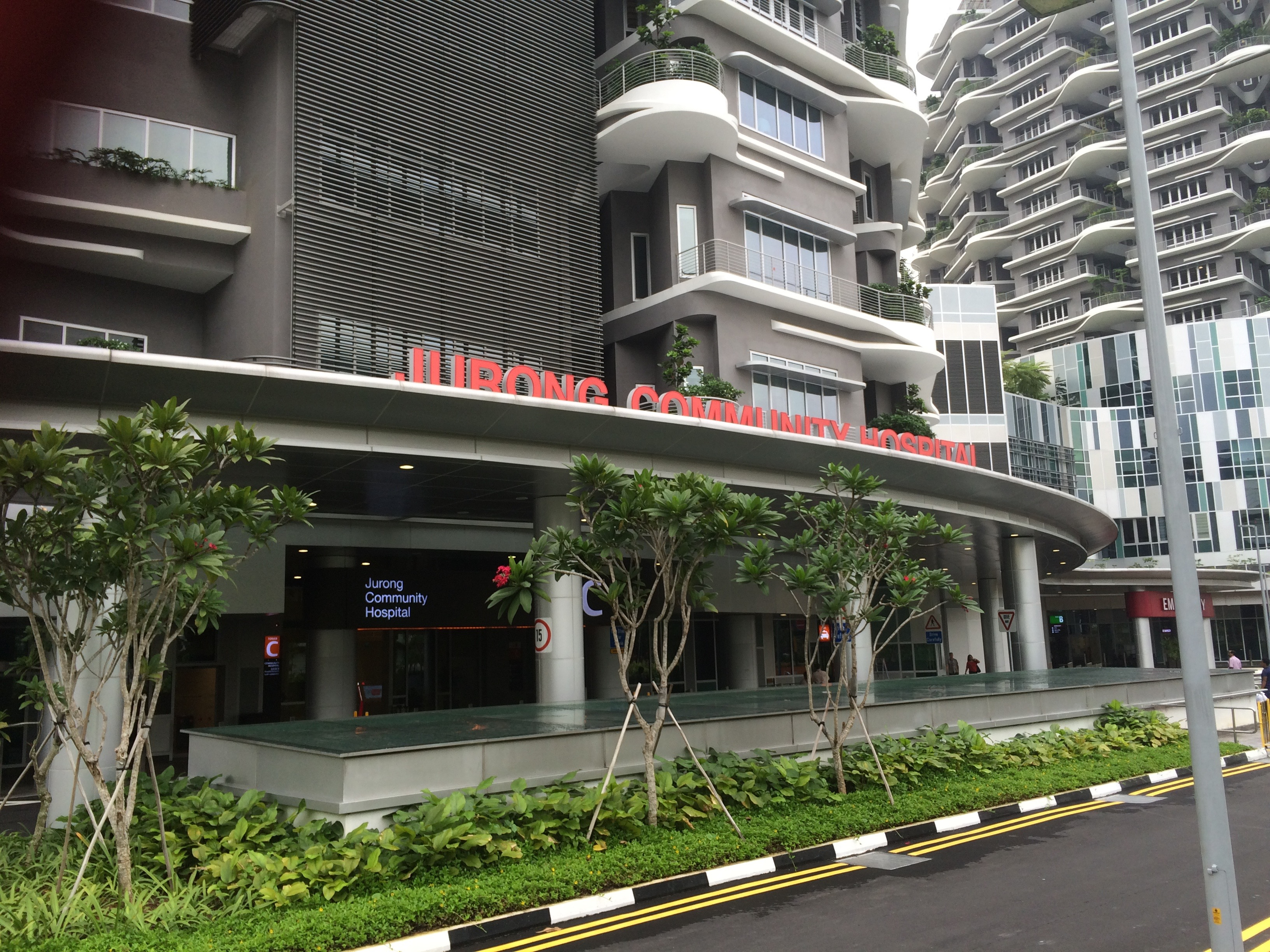
- Main entrance of Jurong Community Hospital

Geography
- Location: 1 Jurong East Street 21, Singapore 609606, Singapore
- Coordinates: 1.3329444°N 103.7470833°E

Organisation
- Type: Community hospital

Services
- Emergency department: No Accident & Emergency
- Beds: 400

History
- Founded: 22 July 2015; 10 years ago (Soft opening); 10 October 2015; 10 years ago (Official opening)

Links
- Website: www.jch.com.sg
- Lists: Hospitals in Singapore

The Jurong Community Hospital (JCH) is a 400-bed community hospital in Jurong East, Singapore. It is part of an integrated healthcare development that includes the Ng Teng Fong General Hospital (NTFGH). While Jurong Community Hospital has commenced operations from 22 July 2015, it was officially opened alongside NTFGH on 10 October of the same year.

== History ==
The building of the integrated healthcare hub incorporating both the Ng Teng Fong General Hospital and Jurong Community Hospital began in September 2012 and was slated for completion by 2015 (originally December 2014 for NTFGH), with an estimated budget of S$700 million. Having won the tender for its construction, CPG Consultants served as the main developer of the integrated hub.

In 2013, the integrated hub (including Jurong Community Hospital) received the Green Mark Platinum Award by the Building Construction Authority of Singapore for its inclusion of environmentally sustainable design features.

The hospital commenced operations on 22 July 2015.

On 10 October that year, Jurong Community Hospital, along with Ng Teng Fong General Hospital, was officially opened at JurongHealth's Health Carnival, by guest-of-honour Prime Minister Lee Hsien Loong.

In 2020, Jurong Community Hospital achieved Electronic Medical Record Adoption Model (EMRAM) Stage 6.

== Features ==
=== Mobility Park and LIFE Hub ===
JCH is the first hospital in Singapore to have a mobility park, which enables patients to gradually re-adapt to daily living. It is equipped with ramps, steps, textured surfaces, as well as a simulation of public transport facilities (including MRT carriages and buses), in a safe environment.

In addition, the LIFE Hub, comprising a mock-up of a three-room HDB flat fitted with accessibility products, aids patients in acclimatising back into their home environment.

=== Connectivity ===
JCH (as well as the Ng Teng Fong General Hospital) are linked to J-Walk, a second-story pedestrian network in the Jurong Gateway area that connects them to Jurong East MRT station and Jurong East Bus Interchange, as well as the nearby shopping malls (Jem, Westgate, Big Box, IMM).

== See also ==
- Ng Teng Fong General Hospital
- Healthcare in Singapore
- Hospitals in Singapore
- Ministry of Health (MOH), Singapore
