= Singlife =

Singaporean insurance company

Singapore Life Limited
- Company type: Public
- Industry: Insurance
- Founded: 2017; 9 years ago
- Founder: Walter de Oude
- Headquarters: Singapore
- Area served: Singapore
- Key people: Pearlyn Phau (CEO); Ray Ferguson (Chairman)
- Products: Life insurance Health insurance Protection plans Savings plans Investment plans
- Website: singlife.com

Singapore Life Limited, commonly known as Singlife, is a Singaporean insurance company.

== History ==
Singlife was established by Walter de Oude in 2017 as the first local insurer to be licensed by the Monetary Authority of Singapore since 1970. In 2018, Singlife acquired the business portfolio of Zurich Life Singapore. In 2020, Singlife and Aviva Singapore announced a merger deal valued at $3.2 billion, which made the combined company the largest insurer in Singapore.

On 13 September 2023, Aviva announced its withdrawal from the Singlife joint venture. The company entered into an agreement to sell its 25.9% stake in Singlife, as well as two debt instruments, to Sumitomo Life Insurance Company for a total cash consideration of SGD1.4 billion (£0.8 billion). The sale is expected to complete in Q4 2023, subject to customary closing conditions and regulatory approvals. Aviva's decision to exit the Singlife joint venture follows its earlier sale of the majority stake in Aviva Singapore to a consortium led by Singlife in 2020.

On 4 February 2026, Singlife launched Physical gold-backed investment-linked policies (ILPs) amid rise in gold prices.
