= Napier Healthcare =

Healthcare information technology company

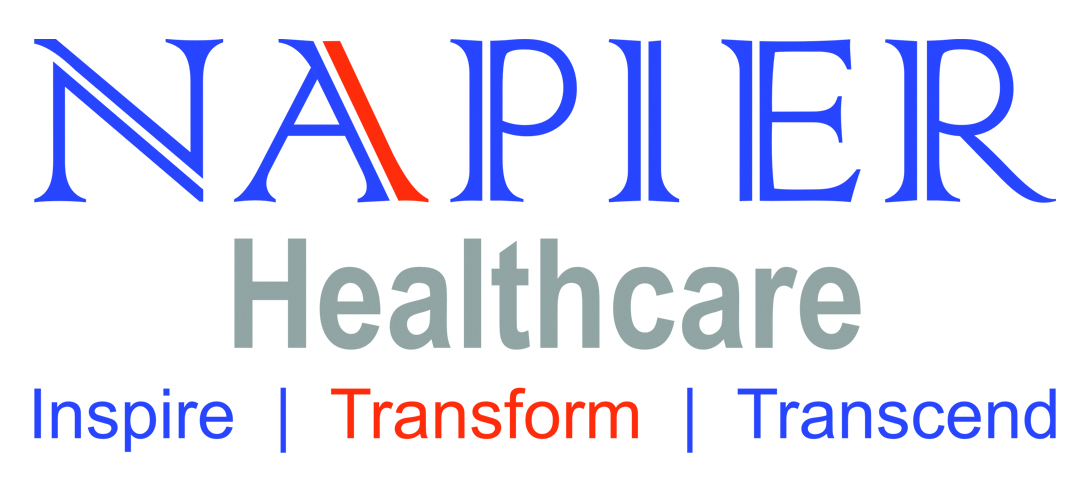
- Type: Private
- Industry: Health Care
- Founded: 1996
- Headquarters: Singapore
- Area served: Worldwide
- Number of employees: 401 (2024)
- Website: www.napierhealthcare.com

Napier Healthcare is a healthcare information technology company, established in 1996, that offers healthcare software for private and government hospitals, clinics, pharmacies and diagnostic centers.

Napier is headquartered in Singapore with its global development center in Hyderabad and business operations in Mumbai, Delhi, and Bangalore in India. Napier's presence is extended to Turkey, Saudi Arabia, Dubai, China, South Africa, Kenya, Tanzania, Bhutan and Malaysia.

== History ==
Napier Healthcare was formed in 1996 as "Karishma Software". On 17 September 2010, the company was renamed "Napier Healthcare". Napier provides information technology solutions in healthcare. In November 2012, the company appointed Karthik Tirupathi, an IT industry veteran, as CEO to lead its geographic expansion and growth efforts and was its CEO until June 2024.

In February 2025, Singapore’s Ministry of Manpower (MOM) launched an investigation into Napier Healthcare Solutions following multiple claims of unpaid salaries from employees. According to reports by The Straits Times and The Online Citizen, some employees alleged that they had not received full salaries since November 2023. The company attributed the delays to cash flow issues and stated that it intended to settle outstanding payments.

== Partners ==
Napier Healthcare works with IT companies such as IBM, HP, Intel, Microsoft, Oracle, etc.

== Products & services ==
- Napier Hospital Information System (HIS)
- Napier Intermediate & Long-term Care (iLTC)
- Napier Remote Patient Monitoring (RPM) Solution
- Care Mobility
- Regulatory Medical Systems
- Napier Assistant
- Interactive EMR
- Patient Portal
- MyNapier
