= Raffles Hospital =

Hospital in Singapore

Raffles Hospital (Chinese: 莱佛士医院)
- Raffles Medical Group
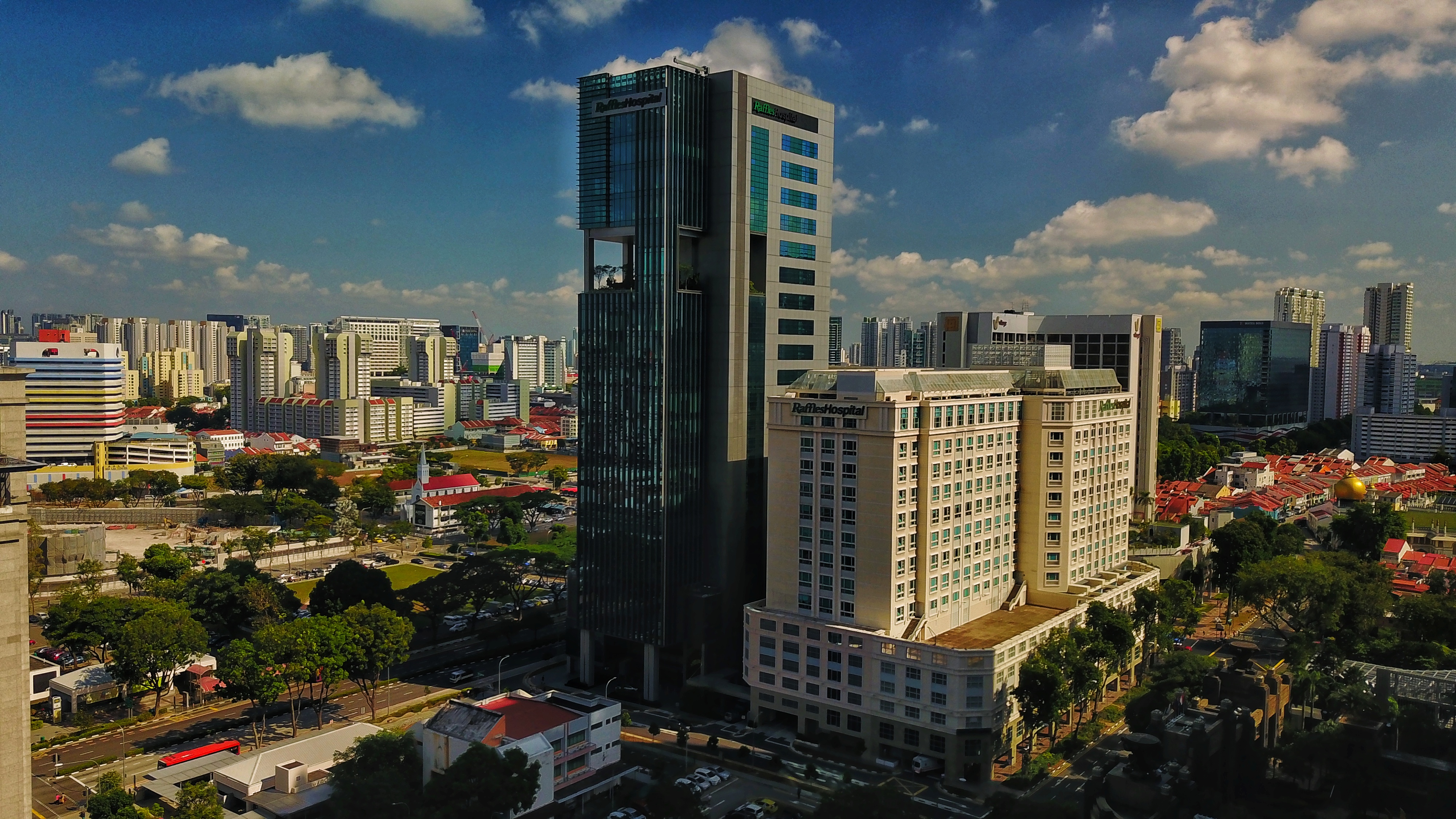
- Raffles Hospital in Singapore

Geography
- Location: 585 North Bridge Rd, Singapore 188770
- Coordinates: 1.301297°N 103.857291°E

Organisation
- Type: General

Services
- Emergency department: Yes
- Beds: 380

History
- Founded: March 16, 2002

Links
- Website: www.raffleshospital.com

Raffles Hospital (abbreviation: RH) (Chinese: 莱佛士医院; pinyin: Lái fú shì yīyuàn) is a tertiary care private hospital of the Raffles Medical Group, a private healthcare provider in Singapore.

== History ==
On September 12, 1997, two companies, Raffles Medical Group and Pidemco Land formed a joint-venture company to convert Blanco Court, a former office-and-shopping block situated near the Bugis Mass Rapid Transit Station, into the present Raffles Hospital.

Raffles Hospital was officially opened on March 16, 2002 by the former Deputy Prime Minister Lee Hsien Loong.

== Hospital Building ==
The hospital is an L-shaped building covering 540,000 sq ft (50,000 m^{2}) of floor space over 13 floors. It is a retrofitted building that has retained the main superstructure of its predecessor, Blanco Court.

Patient accommodation at the hospital includes suites, private rooms, double rooms and cost-saving four-bedroom and six-bedroom facility.

On December 13, 2008, Raffles Hospital was accredited by the Joint Commission International.

== Awards ==
Raffles hospital was rated hospital of the year in 2016 by Frost & Sullivan Singapore Excellence Awards. With 380 in-patient beds, Raffles Hospital was rated by Newsweek as the number 10 hospital in Singapore in 2020.
