= Health Promotion Board =

Agency overview
- Formed: 1 April 2001; 25 years ago
- Jurisdiction: Singapore
- Headquarters: 3 Second Hospital Avenue, Singapore 168937
- Agency executives: Wong Kim Yin, Chairman; Tay Choon Hong, CEO
- Parent agency: Ministry of Health
- Website: www.hpb.gov.sg
- Agency ID: T08GB0014L

The Health Promotion Board (HPB) is a statutory board under the Ministry of Health of the Government of Singapore. It was established in 2001 to act as the main driver for national health promotion and disease prevention programmes.

== School Health Programmes ==
- Student Health Centre and Student Dental Centre
- Healthy Meals in School Programme

== Workplace Health Programmes ==
- Workplace Outreach Wellness Package

== Healthy Food & Dining Programmes ==
- Healthier Choice Symbol Programme
- Healthier Dining Programme
- Eat, Drink, Shop Healthy Challenge

== Physical Activity Programmes ==
- National Steps Challenge
- MOVE IT! Workouts
- Lose to Win

== Preventive Health Programmes ==
- Screen For Life
- Smoking Cessation Programme

== Chairman ==
- April 2017 – March 2024: Philip Lee
- April 2024 – present: Wong Kim Yin

== See also ==
- Healthcare in Singapore
