= National University Hospital =

Hospital in Singapore

Coordinates: 1°17′42.3″N 103°46′58.2″E

National University Hospital 国立大学医院 (Chinese) Hospital Universiti Nasional Singapura (Malay) தேசிய பல்கலைக்கழக மருத்துவமனை (Tamil)
- National University Health System
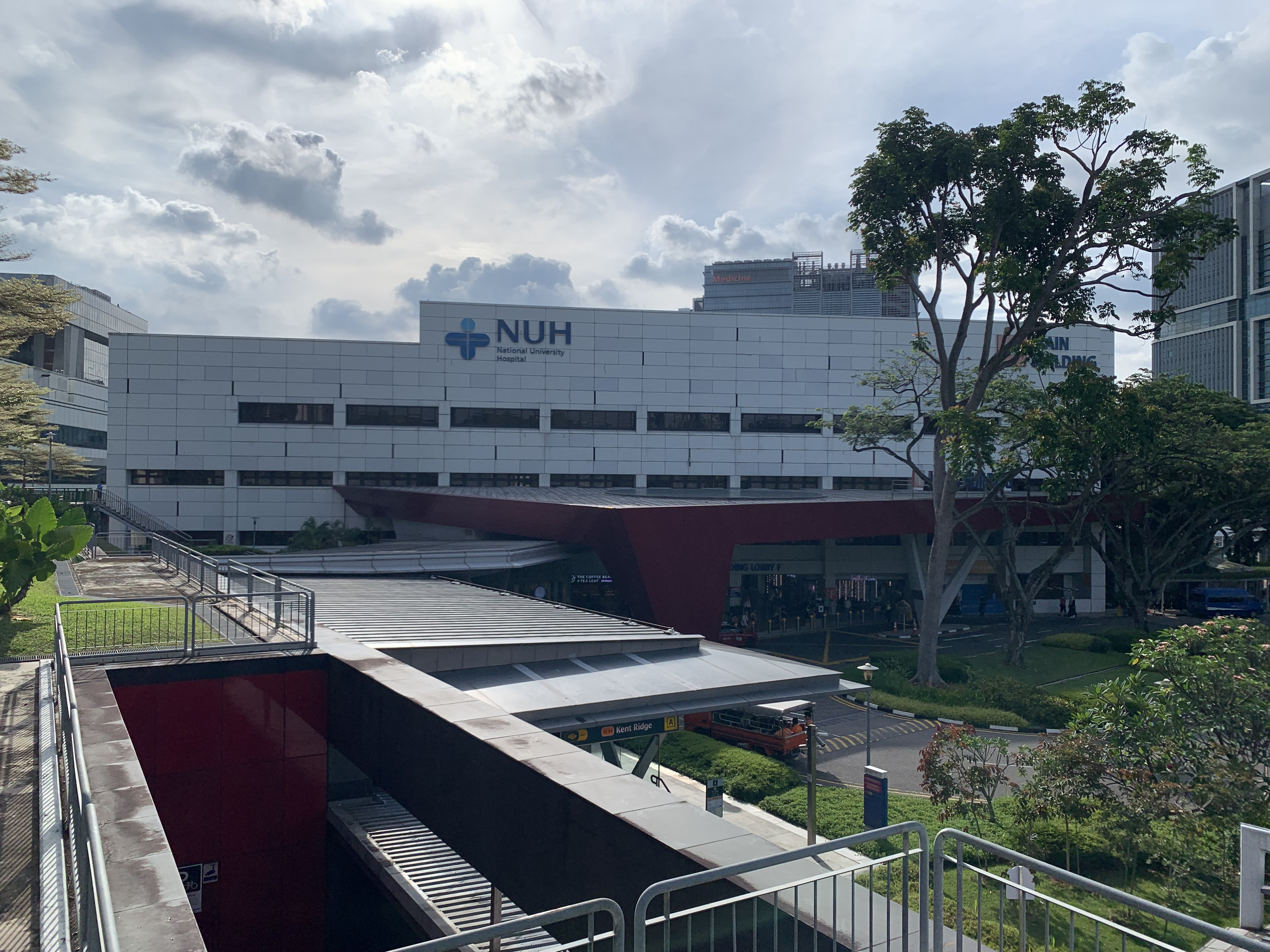
- Main Building of NUH

Geography
- Location: 5 Lower Kent Ridge Road, Singapore 119074, Singapore

Organisation
- Type: Teaching, District General
- Affiliated university: Yong Loo Lin School of Medicine, NUS

Services
- Emergency department: Yes Accident & Emergency
- Beds: 1239

History
- Founded: 24 June 1985; 41 years ago

Links
- Website: www.nuh.com.sg
- Lists: Hospitals in Singapore

National University Hospital

Chinese name
- Simplified Chinese: 国立大学医院
- Traditional Chinese: 國立大學醫院
Transcriptions
Standard Mandarin
- Hanyu Pinyin: Guólì Dàxué Yīyuàn

Malay name
- Malay: Hospital Universiti Nasional Singapura

Tamil name
- Tamil: தேசிய பல்கலைக்கழக மருத்துவமனை

The National University Hospital (NUH) is a tertiary referral hospital and academic medical centre in Singapore, located in Kent Ridge. It is a 1,160-bed tertiary hospital serving more than 670,000 outpatients and 49,000 inpatients and serves as a clinical training centre and research centre for the medical and dental faculties of the National University of Singapore (NUS).

NUH is the flagship hospital of the National University Health System and the principal teaching hospital for the NUS Yong Loo Lin School of Medicine. Its campus includes three national speciality centres, namely the National University Cancer Institute, Singapore (NCIS), the National University Heart Centre, Singapore (NUHCS) and the National University Centre for Oral Health, Singapore (NUCOHS).

== History ==
NUH was originally known as the Kent Ridge Hospital according to its proposal as early as 1972, with a second plan drawn in 1975 by the then-University of Singapore Development Unit, when the hospital was planned at the Kent Ridge area, which actually cost $193 million to build, with an initial projection of 752 beds and a cost of $143 million. Construction began in 1980 and the entire project was completed at the end of 1984. NUH was the first privately run, government-owned hospital under the owner and managed by Temasek Holdings.

NUH received its new staff on 15 January 1985 (on the same day itself, Kent Ridge Hospital was renamed to NUH). The hospital opened to the public and received its first patients on 24 June 1985, with the opening of two departments namely the Department of Medicine and the Department of Orthopedic Surgery. The hospital was then officially opened on 17 June 1986 by Goh Chok Tong, then First Deputy Prime Minister and Minister for Defence. Prior to its opening, clinical training for the students of NUS was carried out at the Singapore General Hospital (SGH), where the university's medical school was located until it moved to the new NUS campus at Kent Ridge in 1986.

The hospital was originally owned by Temasek Holdings, a government investment holding company. It came under the Ministry of Health's Health Corporation of Singapore (HCS) in 1987. In 1990, the government decided to hand over the governance of the hospital to the National University of Singapore (NUS). This was in tune with the government's idea of making NUH the principal medical teaching institution of Singapore. In order to avoid duplication of services, the government decided to make highly specialised units available at only two places, SGH and NUH. All other hospitals were to house general speciality departments only. Since NUH was too large a financial operation to be transferred entirely in one go, the hospital first reverted to Temasek Holdings before being transferred to NUS in phases. The hospital added in a 200-bed, seven-storey tower ward block, eight operating theatres, and intensive care units over an area of 3.2 ha at a cost of S$100 million.

NUH was conferred the Joint Commission International (JCI) accreditation in August 2004 and the Singapore Service Class award in July 2004. It also received a triple ISO certification:

In August 2007, Minister for Health Khaw Boon Wan announced plans to build two new national centres at NUH for heart and cancer treatments. The National University Heart Centre, Singapore (NUHCS) announced its plans during a press conference on 2 December 2008 to improve its care and treatment for patients. This will be done by scoping patient care and the delivery of clinical services into four systematic, holistic, and phased programmes:

- Heart failure programme: A model for disease management programme
- Congenital heart disease programme: Span-of-life care
- Acute coronary syndrome programme: timely help for heart attack patients
- Vascular medicine and therapy

In January 2008, NUH and the National University of Singapore's Yong Loo Lin School of Medicine and Faculty of Dentistry came together to form the National University Health System. This helped meet the healthcare needs as it brought about synergy that will be achieved from the integration of education and clinical care. Plans on the National University Cancer Institute, Singapore (NCIS) were announced in 2009. To meet the increasing and anticipated upward trend in healthcare demand, the infrastructure on the Kent Ridge campus will be developed to include extensive research and education facilities to be housed in the NUHS Centre for Translational Medicine building, and two national centres for Cancer and Cardiovascular Medicine at the NUH site.

In April 2014, the National University Cancer Institute, Singapore (NCIS) moved into the NUH Medical Centre, providing one-stop holistic and comprehensive care, management and treatment for both adult and paediatric oncology patients. Covering over 13,000 square metres and occupying levels 8, 9 and 10, the NCIS is housed alongside other outpatient medical specialisations at the NUH Medical Centre and is a one-stop centre for the prevention, management and treatment of cancer.

In January 2013, the NCIS and JurongHealth signed a Memorandum of Understanding known as the Western Cancer Action Network - WCAN - to develop a plan that will lead to the provision of cancer care for people living in the western half of Singapore.

NUH was involved in the successful treatment of six-year-old Oscar Saxelby-Lee from the UK, who had been suffering from acute lymphoblastic leukaemia since December 2018 Oscar became only the second child in the world to undergo CAR-T therapy. He arrived in November 2019 and was discharged back to the UK in April 2020. His treatment had been crowdfunded.

== Visiting Hours ==
Visiting hours at National University Hospital (NUH) are from 12:00 PM to 8:00 PM daily. Please note that the hospital reserves the right to modify visiting hours without prior notice.

Visitors are required to register upon arrival, and the registration is non-transferable. Eating or drinking in the wards is prohibited, and visitors should avoid sitting on patients' beds.

Additionally, photography and video recording are not allowed to maintain patient privacy. For those requiring personal mobility aids, motorized wheelchairs are permitted, but charging them within the hospital is not allowed.

== Transport ==
NUH is accessible by the Kent Ridge station of the Singapore MRT Circle Line.
