= National University Health System =

Healthcare group in Singapore

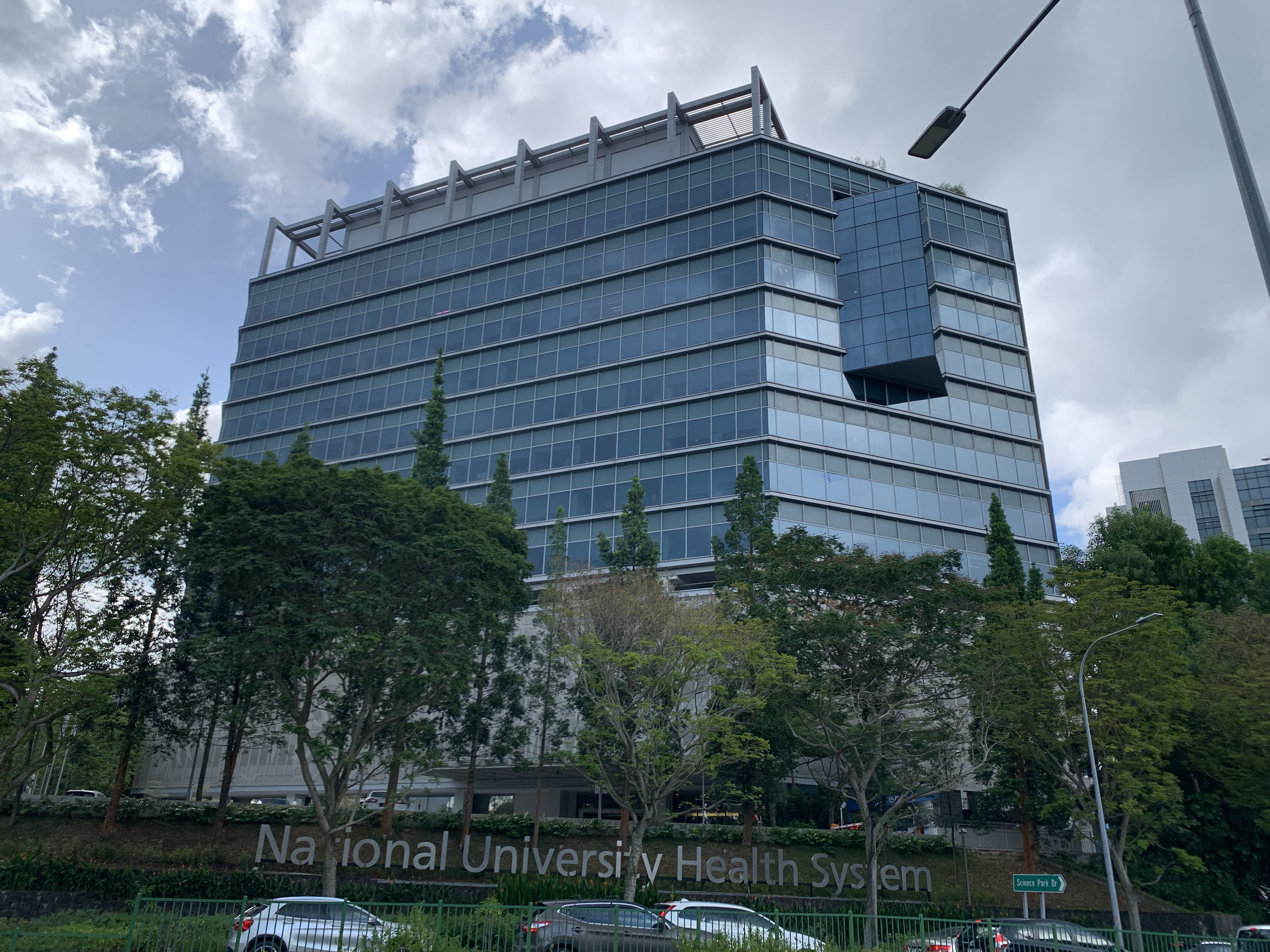
- NUHS Tower, the head office of NUHS, located within the National University Hospital's campus
- Formation: 23 January 2008; 18 years ago
- Registration no.: 200801778C
- Headquarters: National University Health System Building, National University Hospital
- Coordinates: 1.29235°N 103.783467°E
- Owner: Ministry of Health
- Chairman: Tan Chong Meng
- Group CEO: Yeoh Khay Guan
- Parent organization: MOH Holdings Pte Ltd
- Website: www.nuhs.edu.sg

The National University Health System (NUHS) is a group of healthcare institutions in Singapore. The group was formed in 2008 and operates several hospitals, national specialty centres, and polyclinics. The National University Hospital is the largest hospital in the group and serves as the flagship hospital for the cluster.

== History ==
In January 2008, the National University Hospital and the National University of Singapore's Yong Loo Lin School of Medicine and Faculty of Dentistry came together to form the National University Health System. This will help meet the healthcare needs as it brings about synergy that will be achieved from the integration of education, and clinical care.

In 2017, the Ministry of Health (MOH) reorganised the public healthcare system into three integrated clusters to better meet Singaporeans' future healthcare needs, with National University Health System (NUHS) and Jurong Health Services merged. The Ng Teng Fong General Hospital (NTFGH), Jurong Community Hospital (JCH) and Jurong Medical Centre (JCM) were integrated under NUHS. The polyclinics were reorganised, in line with the three new clusters. A new polyclinic group called the National University Polyclinics group is formed and managed by NUHS.

In 2018, Alexandra Hospital came under the management of the NUHS.

== Organisation ==
=== Polyclinics ===
The NUHS operates National University Polyclinics, a network of primary care polyclinics largely situated in the west of Singapore. They provide primary care services to the population in those areas, and also provide training for family medicine physicians.

=== Hospitals ===
==== National University Hospital ====
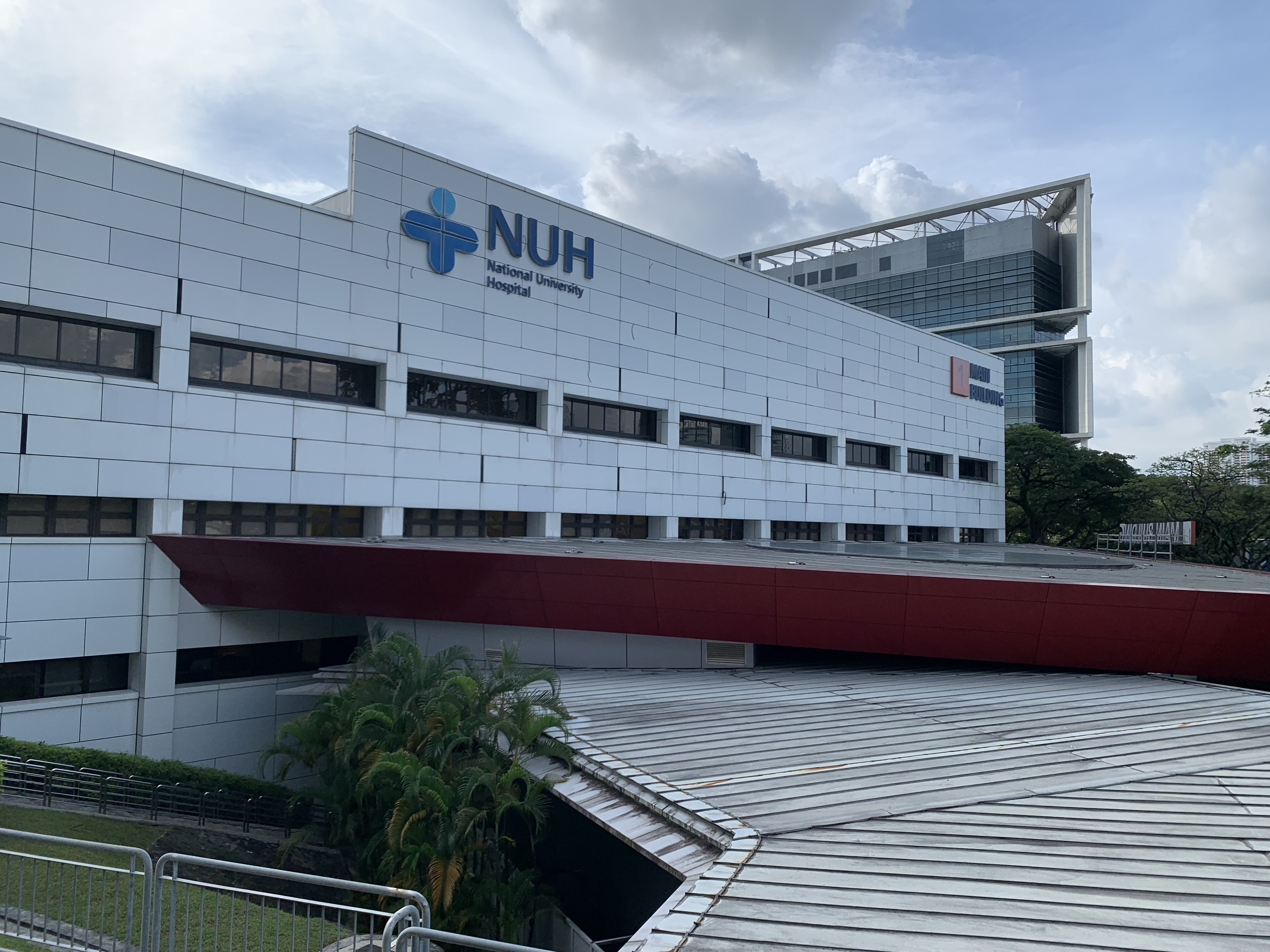
Main Building of NUH

The National University Hospital (NUH) was established in 1985 and it serves as a tertiary hospital, clinical training centre and research centre for the medical and dental faculties of the National University of Singapore (NUS).

==== Alexandra Hospital ====
Alexandra Hospital (AH) is Singapore's first integrated hospital combining acute and community care. It was originally established in 1938 as the British Military Hospital. It is a 326-bed hospital serving the Queenstown precinct, one of the oldest housing estates in Singapore.

==== JurongHealth Campus ====
The JurongHealth Campus is a regional health campus of the National University Health System (NUHS) of Singapore. The campus comprises the integrated 700-bed Ng Teng Fong General Hospital (NTFGH) and 400-bed Jurong Community Hospital (JCH).

=== National specialty centres ===
The national specialty centres of the NUHS are located in the National University Hospital Kent Ridge campus.

==== National University Cancer Institute, Singapore ====
The National University Cancer Institute, Singapore (NCIS) is a national specialty centre and the only public cancer centre in Singapore treating both paediatric and adult cancers in one facility. The NCIS offers a broad spectrum of cancer care and management that ranges from public education, screening and early diagnosis, to treatment, and long-term health maintenance. These span across blood cancers and blood disorders, breast, colorectal, gynaecological, head and neck, liver, pancreatic and biliary, thoracic, urologic, upper gastrointestinal, paediatric haematological malignancies, brain and musculoskeletal cancers. The NCIS houses multidisciplinary tumour groups including but not limited to the Division of Surgical Oncology, the Department of Haematology–Oncology and the Department of Radiation Oncology.

==== National University Heart Centre, Singapore ====
The National University Heart Centre, Singapore (NUHCS), provides treatment and management of complex cardiovascular diseases with focus areas on heart failure, congenital heart disease, acute coronary syndrome, and vascular disease.

==== National University Centre for Oral Health, Singapore ====
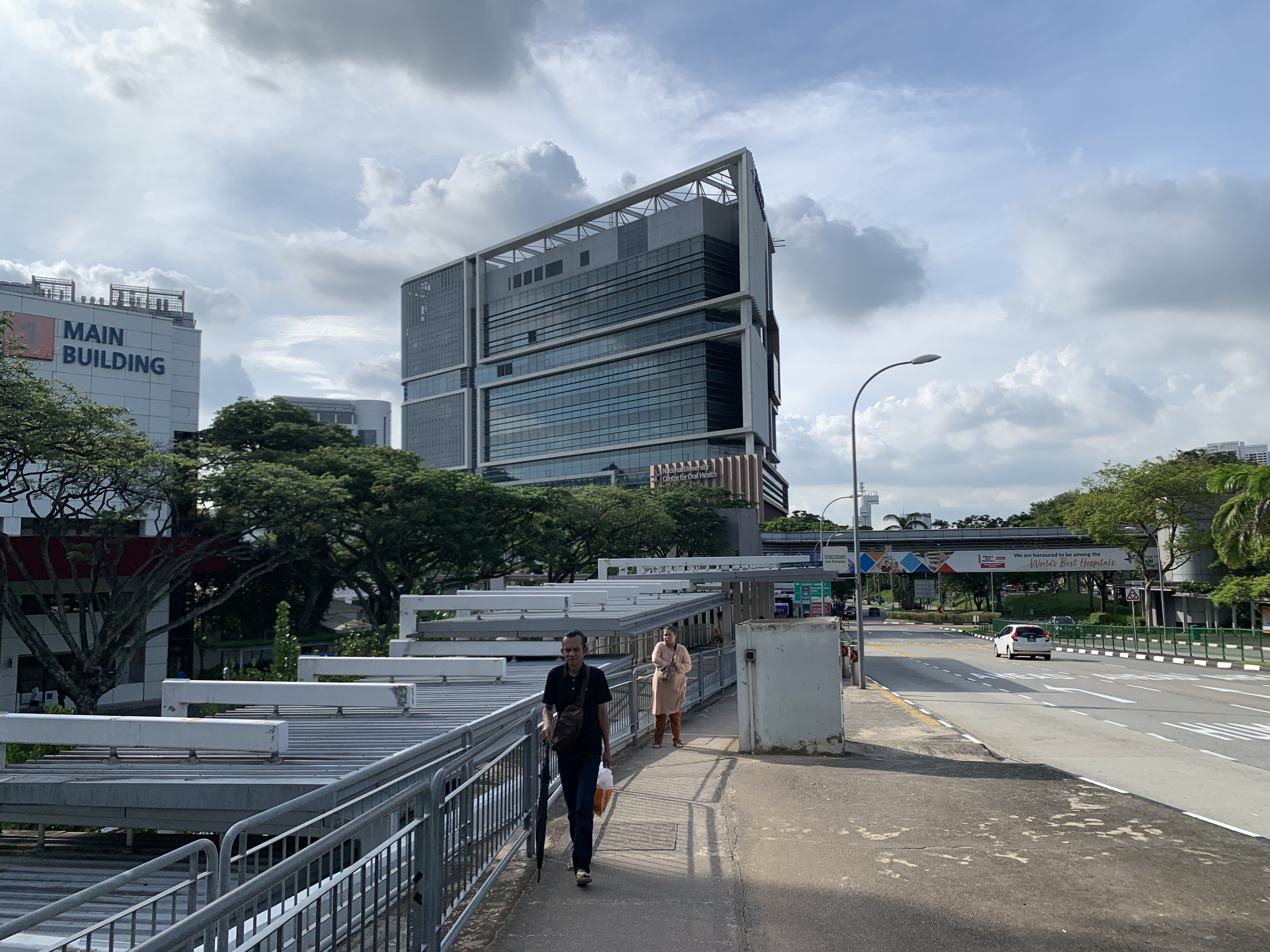
NUCOHS

The National University Centre for Oral Health, Singapore (NUCOHS) brings together NUH's University Dental Cluster (UDC) and NUS's Faculty of Dentistry (FOD) as a national specialty centre for specialist oral healthcare services.

=== Schools ===
NUHS groups the National University of Singapore's (NUS) Yong Loo Lin School of Medicine, Faculty of Dentistry and the Saw Swee Hock School of Public Health under a common governance structure in order to develop and promote academic medicine.

The NUHS focuses on combining medical education and training with extensive research to deliver research-proven clinical care to patients. In line with the collaborative focus of the NUHS, students from the Yong Loo Lin School of Medicine, Faculty of Dentistry and the Saw Swee Hock School of Public Health work alongside senior healthcare professionals to develop their skills under close supervision and mentorship. Academic research carried out in the Yong Loo Lin School of Medicine, Faculty of Dentistry and the Saw Swee Hock School of Public Health also directly drives healthcare practices in the NUHS.

== Medical breakthroughs ==
Since its formation, the NUHS has pioneered a number of medical breakthroughs. This includes performing the first gynaecologic robot-assisted cancer and endoscopic surgery in South East Asia. In 2008, an NUHS research team discovered RUNX3, a gatekeeper gene which prevents the uncontrolled growth of cells leading to colorectal cancers.

== See also ==
- NHG Health
- SingHealth
