= Temasek Cares =

Singaporean charity

Temasek Foundation Cares
- Company type: Non-profit
- Founded: 2009; 17 years ago
- Founders: Temasek Holdings
- Headquarters: Singapore
- Area served: Singapore
- Key people: Richard R Magnus (Chairman)
- Products: Bursaries; Grants; Study Awards
- Services: Social services
- Website: www.temasekcares.org.sg

Temasek Cares CLG Ltd. is a Singaporean non-profit philanthropic organisation set up in 2009 to commemorate the 35th anniversary of Temasek Holdings. In 2016, it was renamed Temasek Foundation Cares.

Backed by four endowments, Temasek Cares' stated goal was to improve the lives of the underprivileged in Singapore. It has aided nearly 17,600 individuals in Singapore over the last five years.

== History ==
In March 2014, Temasek up a new endowment fund of S$40 million to commemorate its 40th anniversary. The new Temasek Emergency Preparedness Fund (T-PREP Fund) was administered by Temasek Cares.

=== 2013/2014 ===
In 2013/2014, S$6.7 million was committed to supporting 4,750 beneficiaries through 18 new programmes. New initiatives for the year included programmes that support children with learning and development delays and programmes that help adults with mental challenges.

=== 2012/2013 ===
In 2012/2013, S$4.55 million in grants were committed to 14 programmes including new and differentiated models of care for over 4,700 Singaporeans and their families.

=== 2011/2012 ===
In 2011/2012, more than S$3.33 million were committed to fund 15 programmes for more than 3,750 under-privileged individuals in Singapore. Supported programmes include those that reach out to Singaporeans with mental challenges, children with learning and developmental delays, abused women and their children, and frail elderly requiring long-term care.

=== 2010/2011 ===
In 2010/2011, Temasek Cares committed grants of S$3.07 million in total to support 3,000 direct beneficiaries through 15 programmes, of which 11 were new or pilot programmes.

=== 2009 ===
Temasek Cares CLG Ltd was founded in 2009 through a grant of S$100 million to the Temasek Trust, an initial endowment gift to fund Singapore community programmes. An additional endowment of $70 million –renamed as the Ee Peng Liang Endowment and the Balaji Sadasivan Endowment –was received on its first anniversary. The S$35 million Ee Peng Liang Endowment is designated for building the capability of the special needs sector.

== Programmes and partnership ==
Temasek Cares partners with various established organisations to support existing programmes or to develop new programmes.

In 2012, the Agency for Integrated Care (AIC), Khoo Teck Puat Hospital (KTPH), and Temasek Cares collaborated to launch iPAL (integrated Promoters of Active Living) to provide cognitive and stimulating activities at home to help the elderly with dementia to maintain their cognitive, physical, and mental functions.
