= HealthCity Novena =

Healthcare quarter in Singapore

- National Healthcare Group
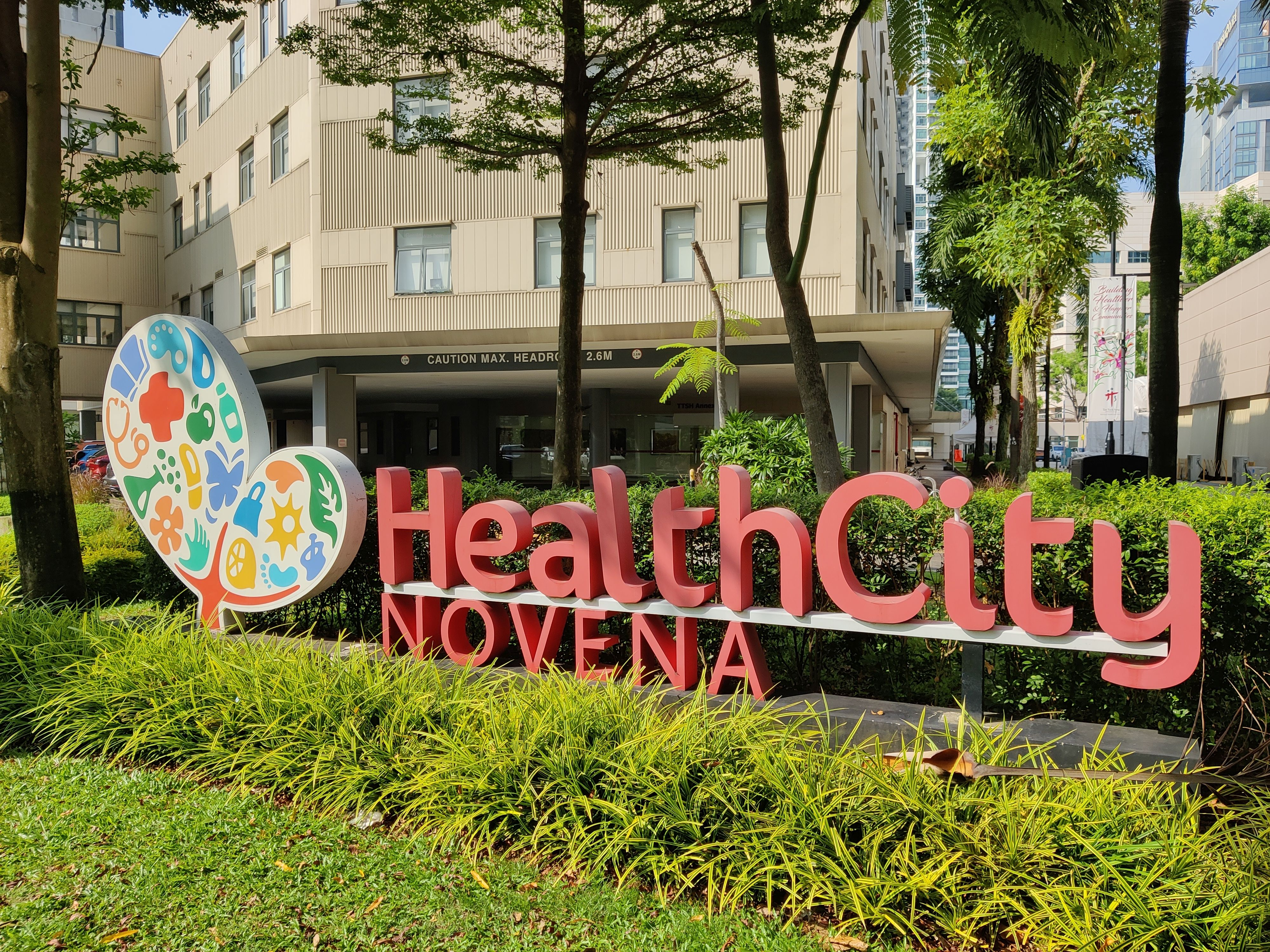

Geography
- Location: Jalan Tan Tock Seng, Novena, Singapore
- Coordinates: 1°19′17.8″N 103°50′45.4″E

Organisation
- Type: Regional Health System
- Affiliated university: Lee Kong Chian School of Medicine

Services
- Emergency department: Adult Level I
- Beds: 2,915

Links
- Lists: Hospitals in Singapore

HealthCity Novena is an integrated healthcare hub located in Novena, Singapore. It anchors the country's Central Regional Health System. By co-locating healthcare services along the spectrum from acute care through rehabilitation to long term care, it aims to enhance collaboration among healthcare institutions.

The healthcare complex is centred around Tan Tock Seng Hospital (TTSH), a 1,700 bed tertiary hospital, with post-acute care facilities such as the Integrated Care Hub, Ren Ci Hospital and Dover Park Hospice, as well as national specialist centres including the National Centre for Infectious Diseases, National Neuroscience Institute and National Skin Centre. Academic institutes including the Clinical Sciences Building of the Lee Kong Chian School of Medicine (LKCMedicine), the Ng Teng Fong Centre for Healthcare Innovation, and various leisure and public spaces complete the complex. It was launched in 2013, with the first phase comprising construction of major buildings substantially completed by 2023.

== History ==
Healthcare facilities have existed in Novena since the relocation of TTSH in 1909, followed by Dover Park Hospice, Ren Ci Community Hospital, National Skin Centre and the National Neuroscience Institute over the years.

In August 2013, the Minister of Health announced that HealthCity Novena, a 17-hectare integrated healthcare hub centered around TTSH, would be jointly developed by the Singapore Ministry of Health (MOH) and the National Healthcare Group (NHG). NHG had been assigned the Central Regional Health System (RHS) as part of the country's public healthcare system reorganization, and HealthCity Novena was to anchor the RHS and link up healthcare facilities to offer acute, intermediate and long-term care. As part of the plan, five new healthcare facilities were announced. Three new buildings forming HealthCity Novena’s Learning Hub were also announced. The complex will linked by sheltered walkways and incorporate boulevards, a Central Park with an open air theatre, and a Community Hub that aims to integrate the complex into the neighbourhood.

A number of heritage buildings were incorporated into the redevelopment, with three formally designated as conservation buildings by the Urban Redevelopment Authority: The former Nurses’ Quarters in Mandalay Road which currently serves as the Lee Kong Chian School of Medicine Headquarters and two old bungalows in Moulmein Road that will form part of the proposed Central Park. In addition, heritage advocates propose that the sole remaining Pavilion ward be similarly conserved as a key part of the Singapore’s medical history and heritage.

== Inpatient Facilities ==
=== Tan Tock Seng Hospital ===
Tan Tock Seng Hospital, a 1,700 bed tertiary referral hospital and the flagship hospital of the National Healthcare Group, was founded in 1844. It moved to its current premises at Novena in 1909, originally covering a large plot of land from Moulmein Road along Akyab Road towards Balestier Road. The hospital wards were adapted from the Nightingale ward concept, and known locally as the Pavilion Wards. In 1957, five 6-storey blocks called the New Ward Blocks were added. In the late 1980s, a plan to replace the old wards with a new 15-storey hospital was proposed. Construction of a S$580-million building at Jalan Tan Tock Seng started in 1993 and was completed in 1998. Following completion of the new building, many of the original hospital buildings, including 4 of the 5 New Ward Blocks and the majority of the Pavilion Wards, were demolished with a view to redeveloping the land for both healthcare and non-healthcare uses.

=== Integrated Care Hub ===
One key driver of HealthCare Novena was the increasing bed occupancy rates at TTSH, due partially to patients staying longer for rehabilitation after acute care. To alleviate the bed crunch, some of these patients were lodged in wards rented from Ang Mo Kio Community Hospital and Ren Ci Hospital, however this was sub-optimal due to the off-site location and lack of specialised rehabilitation services.

The Integrated Care Hub (ICH) was designed to fulfil this gap in step-down care services, specifically those in the areas of tertiary, sub-acute and slow stream rehabilitation, as well as palliative care. Construction started in 2017 and was completed in 2023 after a one-year delay due to Covid-19. The 875,000 square foot, 22-story building comprises 608 beds, including 35 beds set aside for Dover Park Hospice. It contains purpose-built tertiary rehabilitation facilities for patients with complex conditions such as severe brain and spinal cord injuries, stroke and limb loss, and is connected to TTSH and Ren Ci Community Hospital by a sky bridge.

=== Ren Ci Community Hospital ===
Ren Ci, a voluntary welfare organisation founded in 1994, took over seven of TTSH's former Pavilion Wards in 1999 to establish a 210-bedded nursing home facility known as Ren Ci Moulmein Nursing Home. This was followed by the construction of the 277-bed Ren Ci Community Hospital, which started in 2005 on a site between TTSH and the nursing home. The community hospital started operations in December 2008, providing sub-acute and rehabilitation care in a step-down inpatient setting in preparation for home discharge. A collaboration agreement with TTSH, the first between a government and a community hospital in Singapore, was signed in 2009. To facilitate the arrangement, a bridge was built between the two hospitals in December 2009. The nursing home closed in 2017 when the government acquired the premises for non-healthcare purposes.

=== Dover Park Hospice ===
Dover Park Hospice, a non-profit organisation founded in 1992, established Singapore’s first purpose-built hospice along Jalan Tan Tock Seng in 1993. In October 2023, under the HealthCare Novena masterplan, it relocated to the Integrated Care Hub with 35 inpatient and 70 daycare beds dedicated to palliative care.

== National Specialty Centres ==
=== National Centre for Infectious Diseases ===
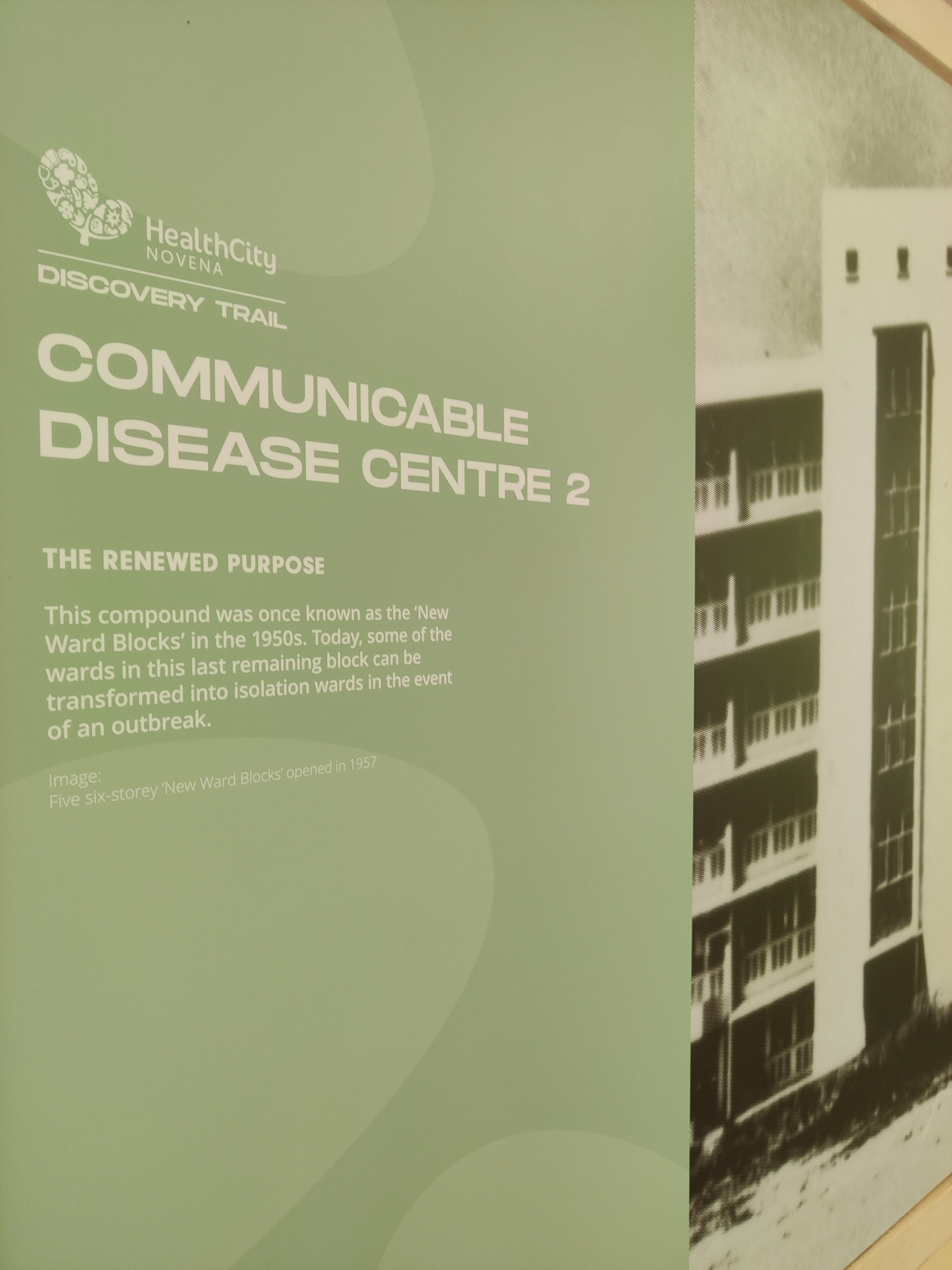
HealthCity Novena Discovery Trail Panel - Communicable Disease Centre 2

The first quarantine facility in Novena was set up at Moulmein Road in 1913, initially known as the Isolation Hospital and subsequently renamed the Middleton Hospital in 1920. In 1985, it merged with TTSH and was renamed the Communicable Disease Centre (CDC). During the SARS outbreak in 2002, an urgent need for containment wards led to the remaining New Ward Block being designated Communicable Disease Centre 2 (CDC2). In 2013, it was announced that as part of the HealthCity Novena masterplan, CDC and CDC2 would be replaced by the National Centre for Infectious Diseases (NCID) as Singapore's key centre for the clinical management of infectious diseases. On 13 December 2018, CDC ceased operations as a medical facility, and the 9.65ha plot of land which it occupied was acquired by the Urban Redevelopment Authority and re-zoned for residential purposes.

NCID officially opened on 7 September 2019. The building is a 14-storey centre with 330 beds in 17 wards, designed with features such as separate passages, lifts and ventilation to reduce the risk of cross-infection. For surge capacity during large outbreaks, the screening centre is able to accommodate 520 patients, with additional capacity for 130 patients if a clinic is converted.

=== National Skin Centre ===
The National Skin Centre (NSC), an outpatient specialist dermatology center, was founded in 1988 to take over the treatment of skin diseases from Middle Road Hospital. As part of HealthCity Novena, a 10-storey building with 69 consultation rooms was built adjacent to the original building on Mandalay Road, starting operations in June 2023.

=== National Neuroscience Institute ===
The National Neuroscience Institute (NNI) was established in 1999 following the transfer of the neurology and neurosurgery departments from Tan Tock Seng Hospital (TTSH) to SingHealth to form a new national centre for the neurosciences. It continued to occupy its original premises within the Tan Tock Seng building, with additional space subsequently acquired for administrative, research and education purposes.

== Education and Research ==
=== Ng Teng Fong Centre for Healthcare Innovation ===
Commonly referred to as the Centre for Healthcare Innovation (CHI), is named for the late Mr Ng Teng Fong following a S$52 million donation in 2014. Construction with the adjacent NCID took place simultaneously, at a cost of S$940 million for both buildings, with CHI officially opening on 9 May 2019.

=== Lee Kong Chian School of Medicine ===
In 1923, the Straits Settlements Mandalay Road Hostel was built to house medical students from the King Edward VII College of Medicine training at TTSH. It then became a nursing hostel from 1957 to 1995. Upon the formation of LKCMedicine in 2010, the neoclassical building was restored and subsequently awarded heritage status in 2013. It was used to trained the first few batches of students and is currently the school's headquarters.

The Clinical Sciences Building commenced construction in 2015 and was officially opened on 2 March 2017. It houses learning, research and recreational facilities including a 500-seat auditorium and the Centre for Clinical Simulation.

== Phase 2 ==
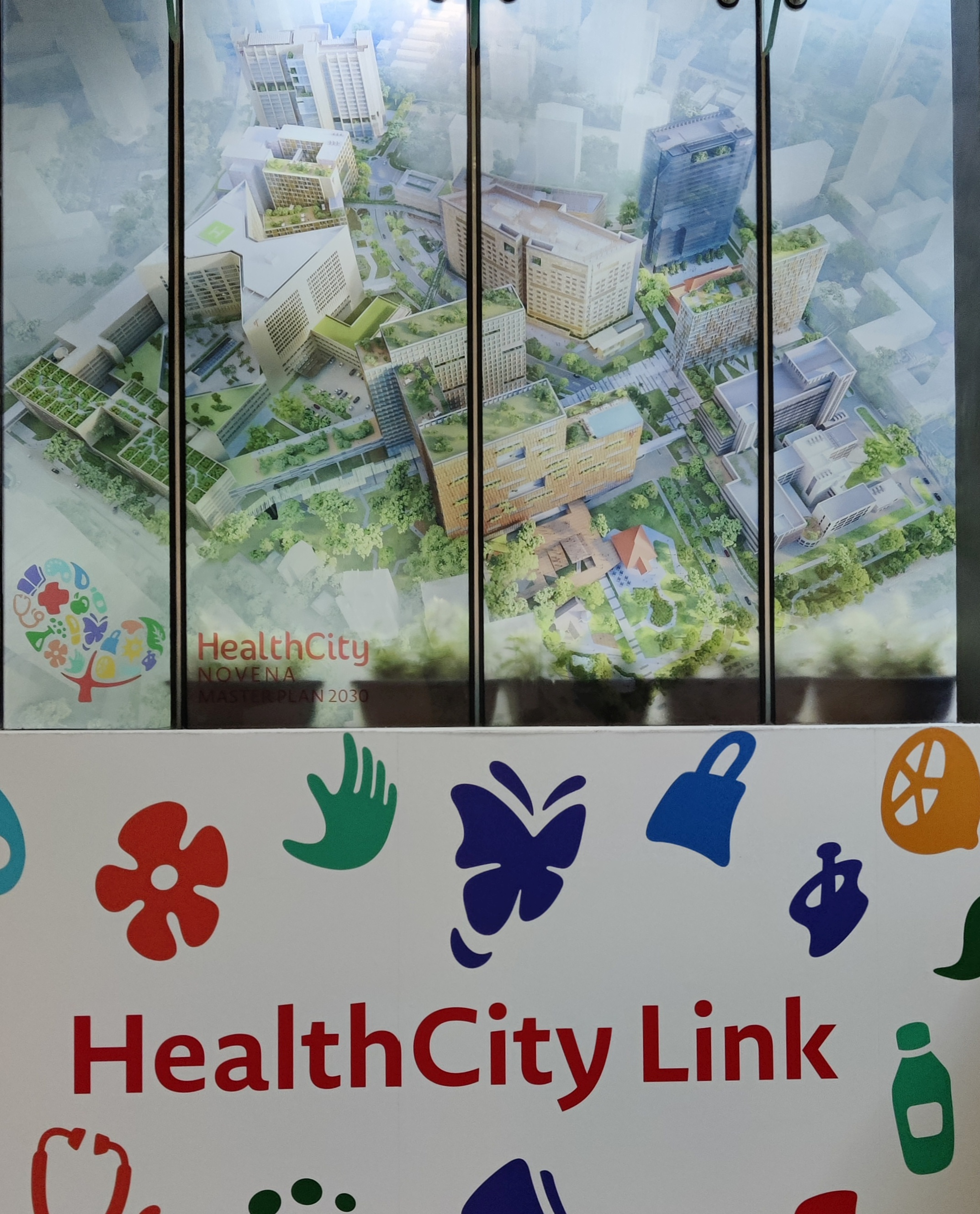
Artist's impression of HealthCity Novena when completed in 2030, over the entrance to underground link

Other proposed buildings include an ambulatory block, a medical education and training centre for TTSH, as well as a new national centre and a health sciences school.

The complex is linked by sheltered walkways, bridges and underground tunnels for safety and comfort, as well as patient privacy.

Leisure and public spaces including a Central Park centred on the conserved Tuberculosis Control Unit and Contact Clinic heritage buildings are planned.
