= Yee-Sin Leo =

Singaporean physician

- 梁玉心
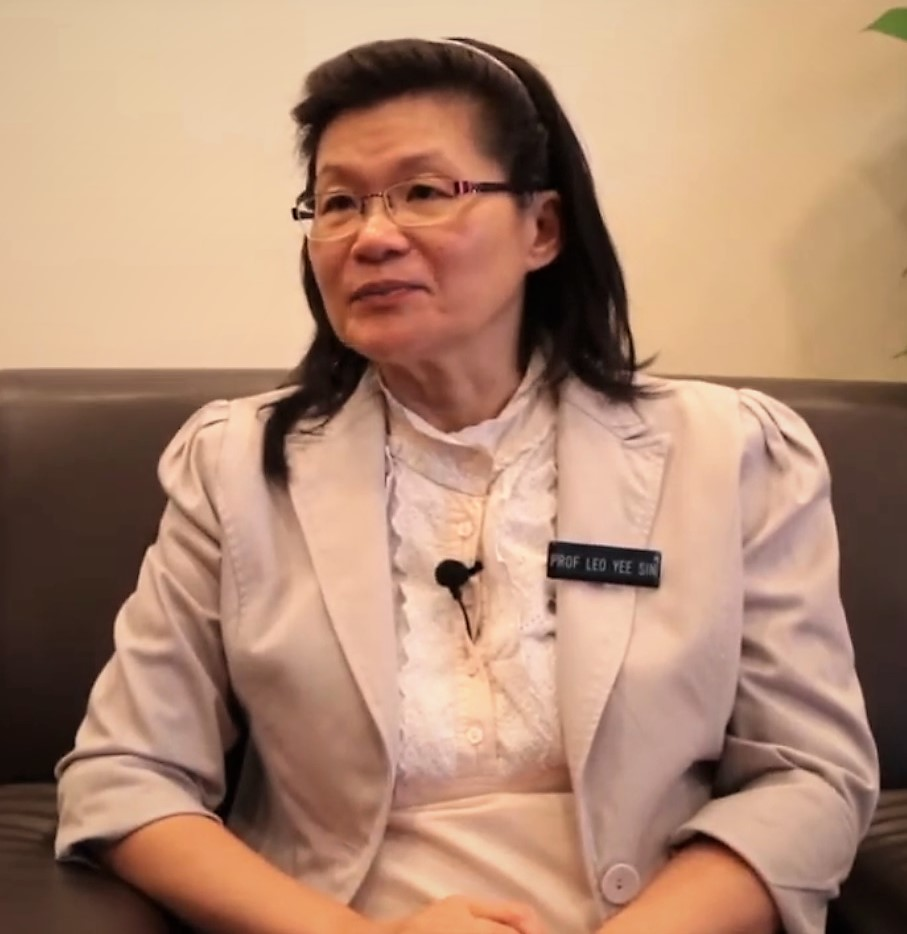
- Leo in 2015
- Born: Leo Yee Sin; 1958 or 1959 (age 66–67); Singapore
- Education: National University of Singapore; Tan Tock Seng Hospital
- Children: 3
- Scientific career
- Workplaces: National Centre for Infectious Diseases

Yee-Sin Leo FRCP (Chinese: 梁玉心; born 1958 or 1959), also known as Yee Sin Leo, is a Singaporean physician. Leo is the executive director of the National Centre for Infectious Diseases and researches emerging infectious diseases. She has been in charge of Singapore's response to several outbreaks, including Nipah, SARS and COVID-19. In 2020, she was selected as one of the BBC's top 100 Women.

== Early life ==
Leo earned her undergraduate degree at the National University of Singapore. She earned her master's of medicine in 1989. She was a medical registrar at Tan Tock Seng Hospital. As a young doctor, Leo was interested in immunology, but after a chance encounter with infectious disease specialist David Allen she became more interested in infectious diseases. She was one of the first doctors to be trained in infectious diseases in Singapore.

== Research and career ==
In 1992, Leo worked as a clinical fellow in Los Angeles, where over half of her workload was HIV cases. When she returned to Singapore she established the country's first HIV programme and patient care centre. Her first frontline experience with infectious diseases were when the Nipah virus infected Singapore in 1999.

In 2002, Leo was made a Senior Consultant in the National Centre for Infectious Diseases (NCID). She has led the country through Middle East respiratory syndrome (MERS), Influenza A virus subtype H7N9 (bird flu) and Dengue fever outbreaks. Leo said that her experiences dealing with the struggles of severe acute respiratory syndrome (SARS) had served her in good stead for taking on COVID-19.

During the COVID-19 pandemic, Leo was cited in the Singapore press telling people that they did not have to wear masks if they did not have symptoms of respiratory infection.

In the preparations for the Global Health Summit hosted by the European Commission and the G20 in May 2021, Leo co-chaired the event's High Level Scientific Panel. Since 2022, she has been serving on the Technical Advisory Panel of the joint World Bank/World Health Organization's Pandemic Fund. That same year, she was inducted into the Singapore Women's Hall of Fame. In 2023, Leo was replaced as executive director of NCID by Vernon Lee. She subsequently became a senior consultant at the Ministry of Health and the National Healthcare Group.

== Personal life ==
Leo is married to a biotechnology specialist. Together they have three children.

== Awards and honours ==
- 2014: Red Ribbon Award
- 2016: National Healthcare Group Distinguished Senior Clinician Award
- 2020: Fortune's World's Greatest Leaders
- 2020: BBC's 100 Women

== Selected publications ==
- Muthuri, Stella G; Venkatesan, Sudhir; Myles, Puja R; Leonardi-Bee, Jo; Al Khuwaitir, Tarig S A; Al Mamun, Adbullah; Anovadiya, Ashish P; Azziz-Baumgartner, Eduardo; Báez, Clarisa; Bassetti, Matteo; Beovic, Bojana (1 May 2014). "Effectiveness of neuraminidase inhibitors in reducing mortality in patients admitted to hospital with influenza A H1N1pdm09 virus infection: a meta-analysis of individual participant data". The Lancet Respiratory Medicine. 2 (5): 395–404. doi:10.1016/S2213-2600(14)70041-4. hdl:10072/67773. ISSN 2213-2600. PMC 6637757. PMID 24815805.
- Young, Barnaby Edward; Ong, Sean Wei Xiang; Kalimuddin, Shirin; Low, Jenny G.; Tan, Seow Yen; Loh, Jiashen; Ng, Oon-Tek; Marimuthu, Kalisvar; Ang, Li Wei; Mak, Tze Minn; Lau, Sok Kiang (21 April 2020). "Epidemiologic Features and Clinical Course of Patients Infected With SARS-CoV-2 in Singapore". JAMA. 323 (15): 1488–1494. doi:10.1001/jama.2020.3204. ISSN 0098-7484. PMC 7054855. PMID 32125362.
- Hsu, Li-Yang; Lee, Cheng-Chuan; Green, Justin A.; Ang, Brenda; Paton, Nicholas I.; Lee, Lawrence; Villacian, Jorge S.; Lim, Poh-Lian; Earnest, Arul; Leo, Yee-Sin (2003). "Severe Acute Respiratory Syndrome (SARS) in Singapore: Clinical Features of Index Patient and Initial Contacts". Emerging Infectious Diseases. 9 (6): 713–717. doi:10.3201/eid0906.030264. ISSN 1080-6040. PMC 3000162. PMID 12781012.
