= Newton, Singapore =

Planning Area in Central Region, Singapore

Newton
- Planning Area

Other transcription(s)
  - Chinese: 纽顿
  - Pinyin: Niǔdùn
  - Malay: Newton
  - Tamil: நியூட்டன்
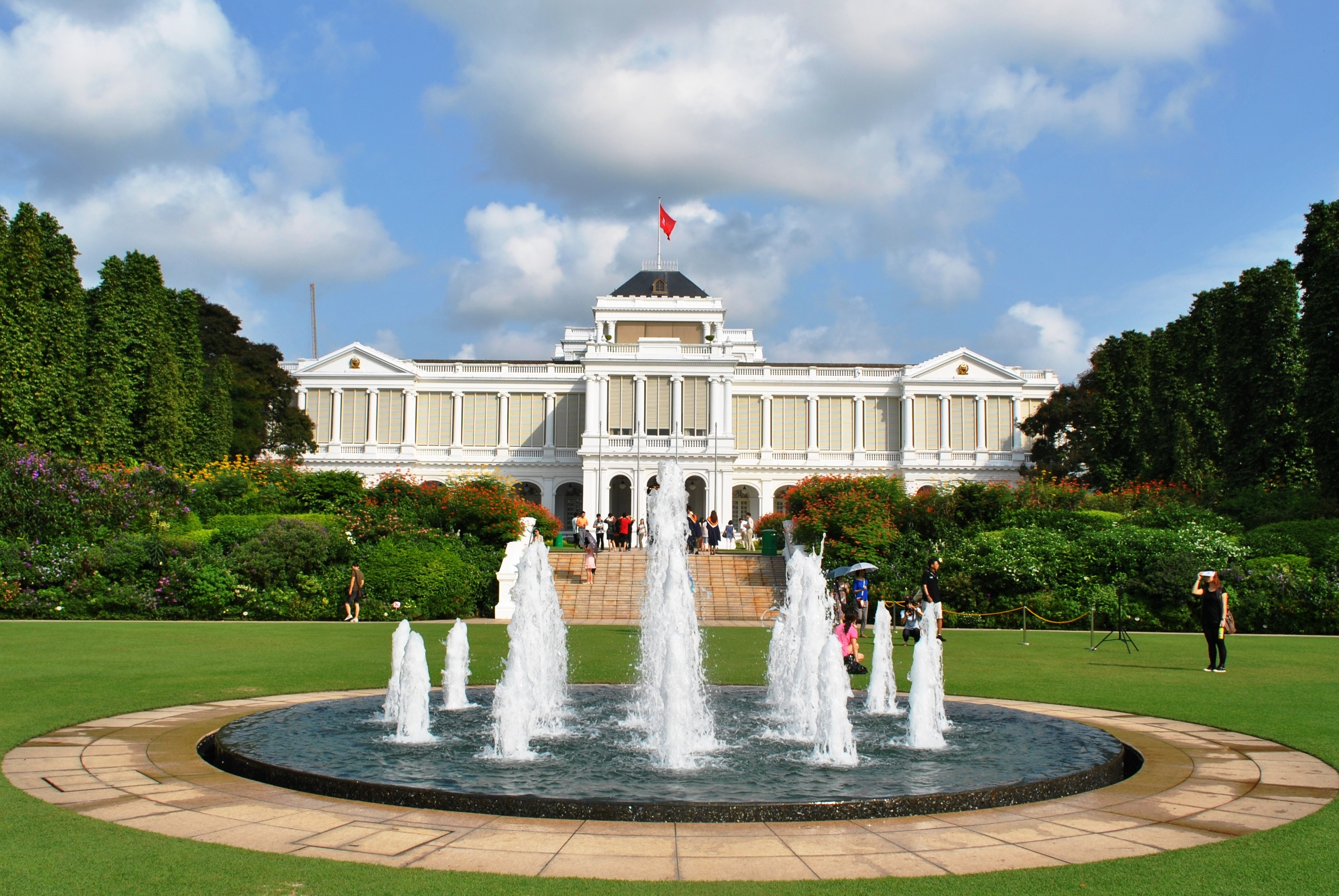
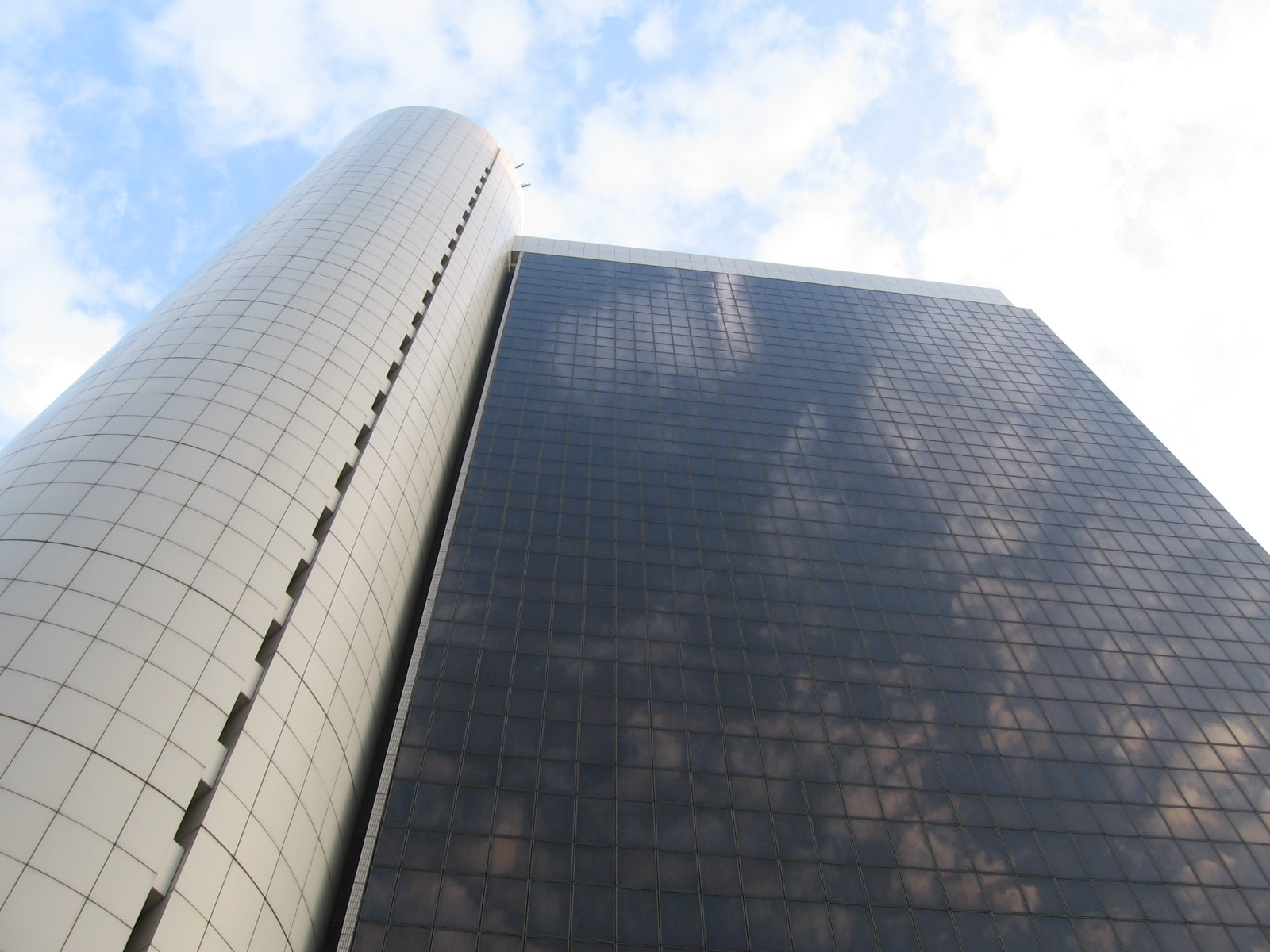
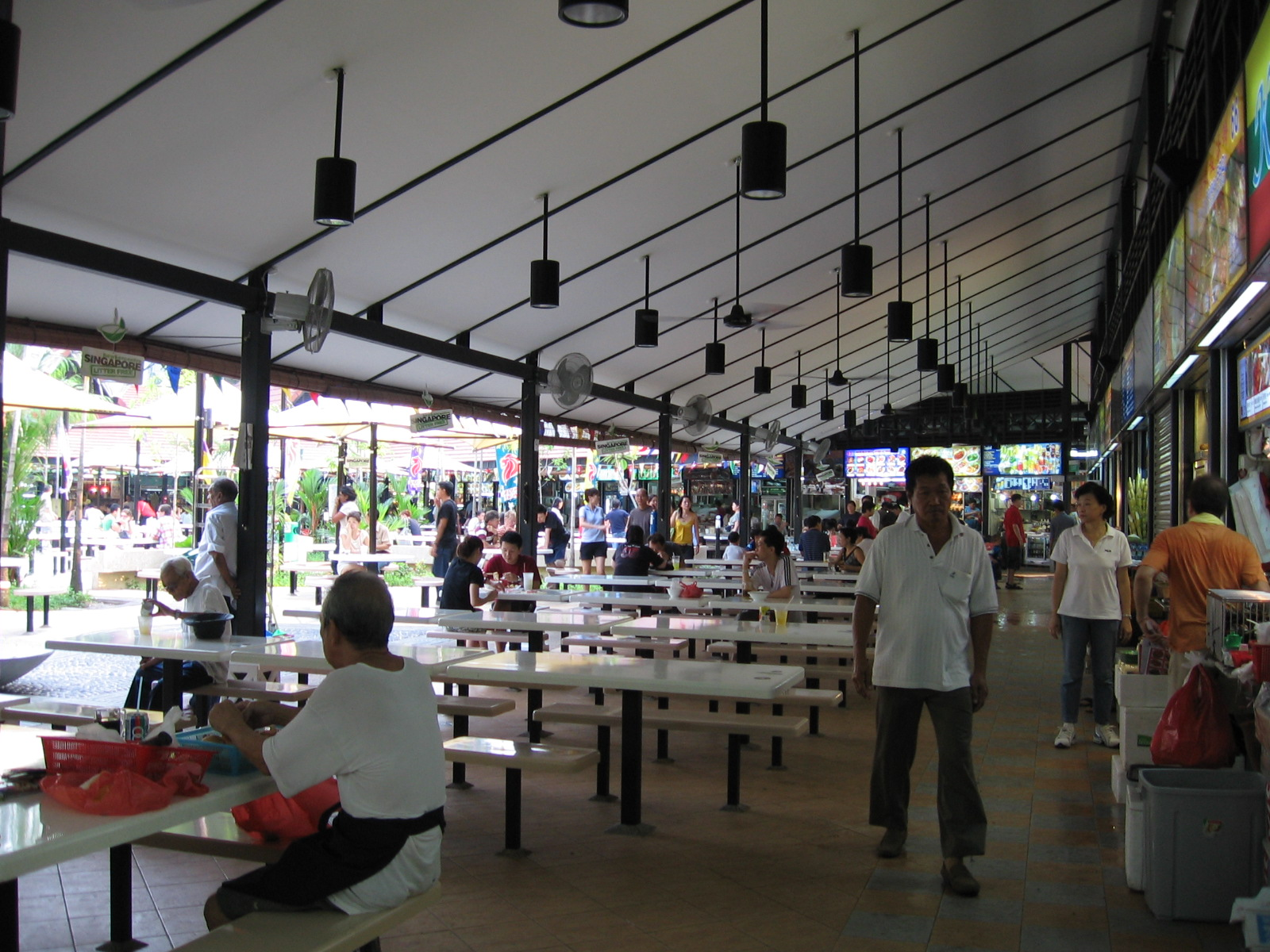
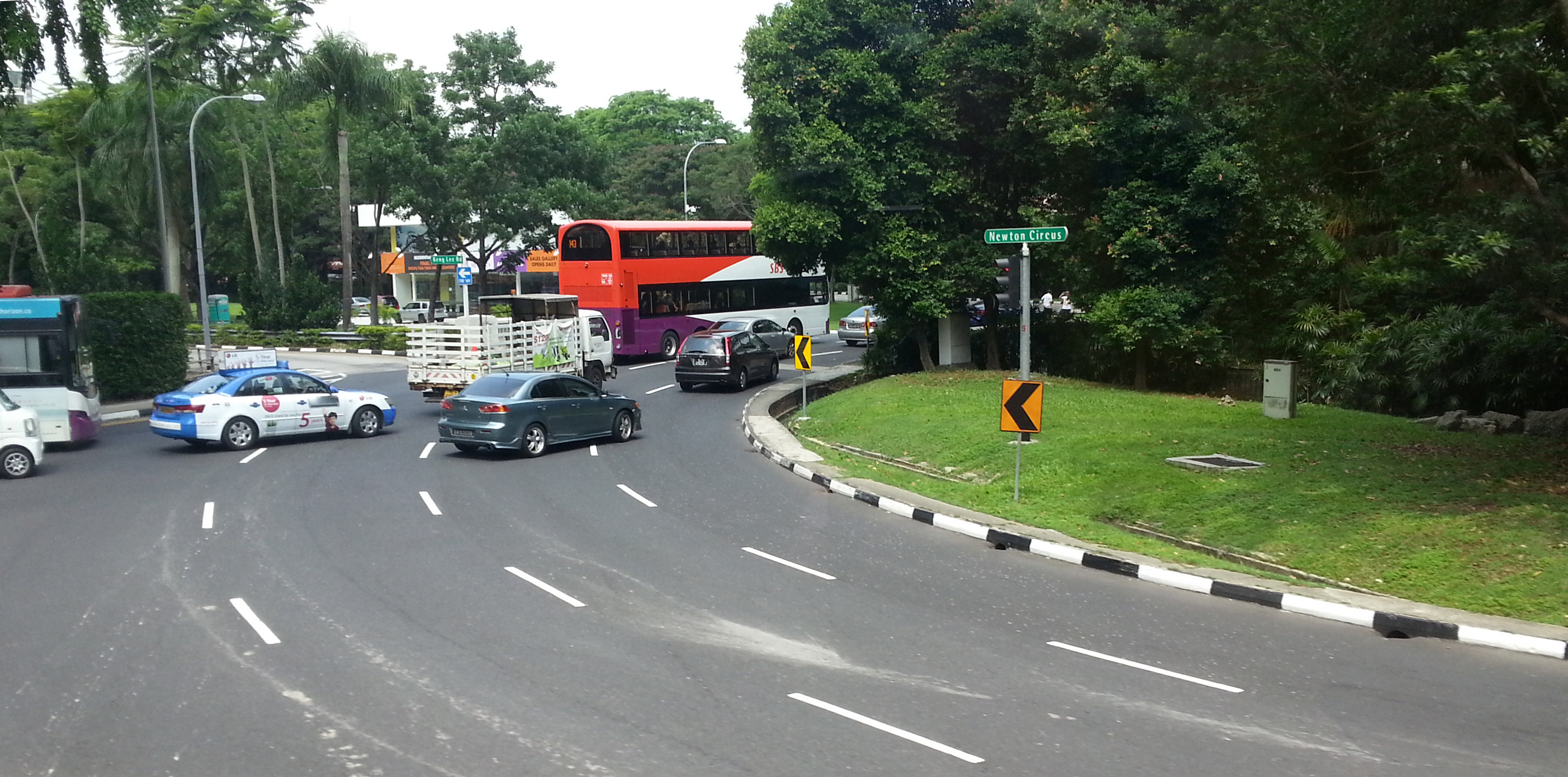
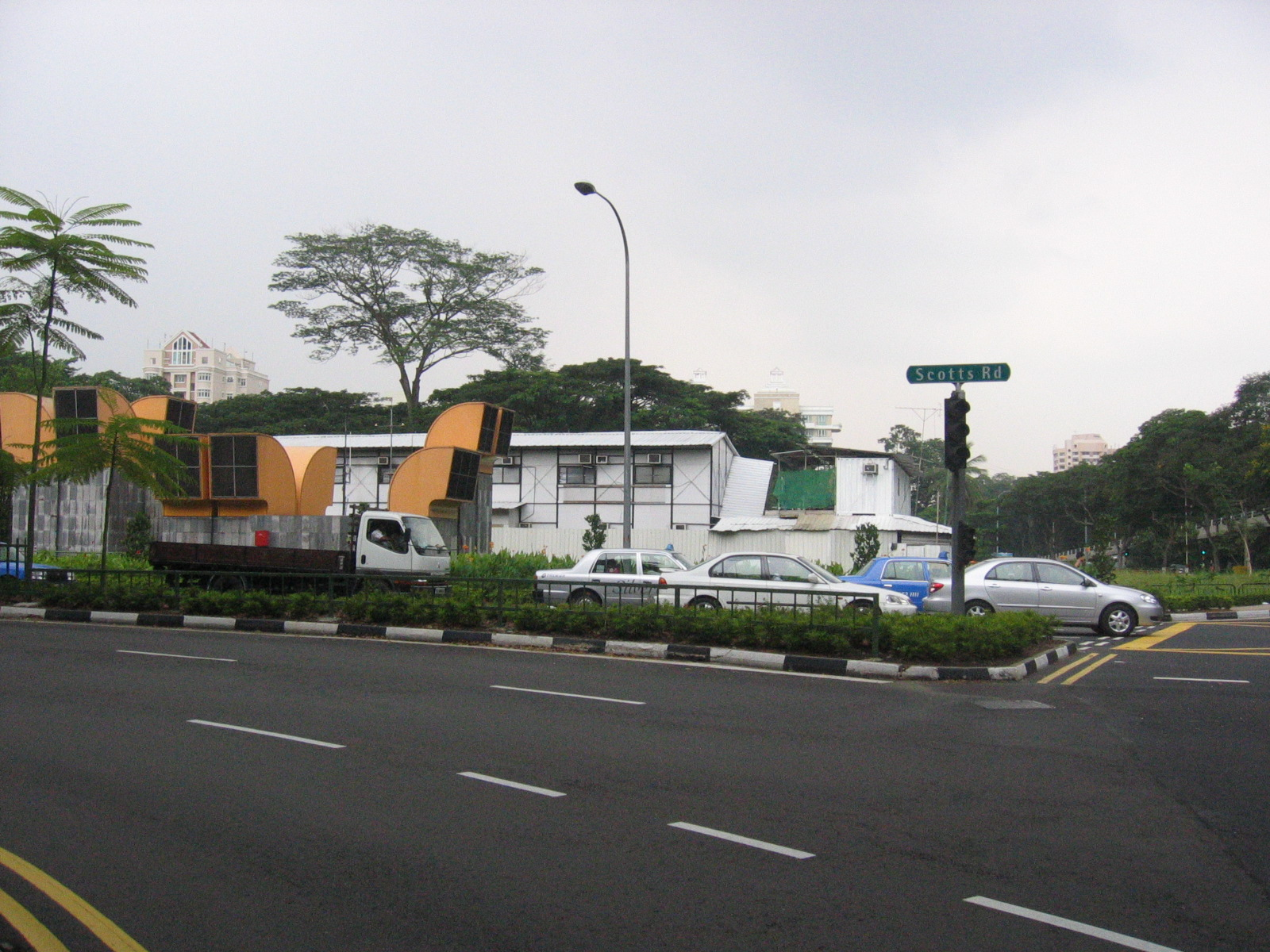
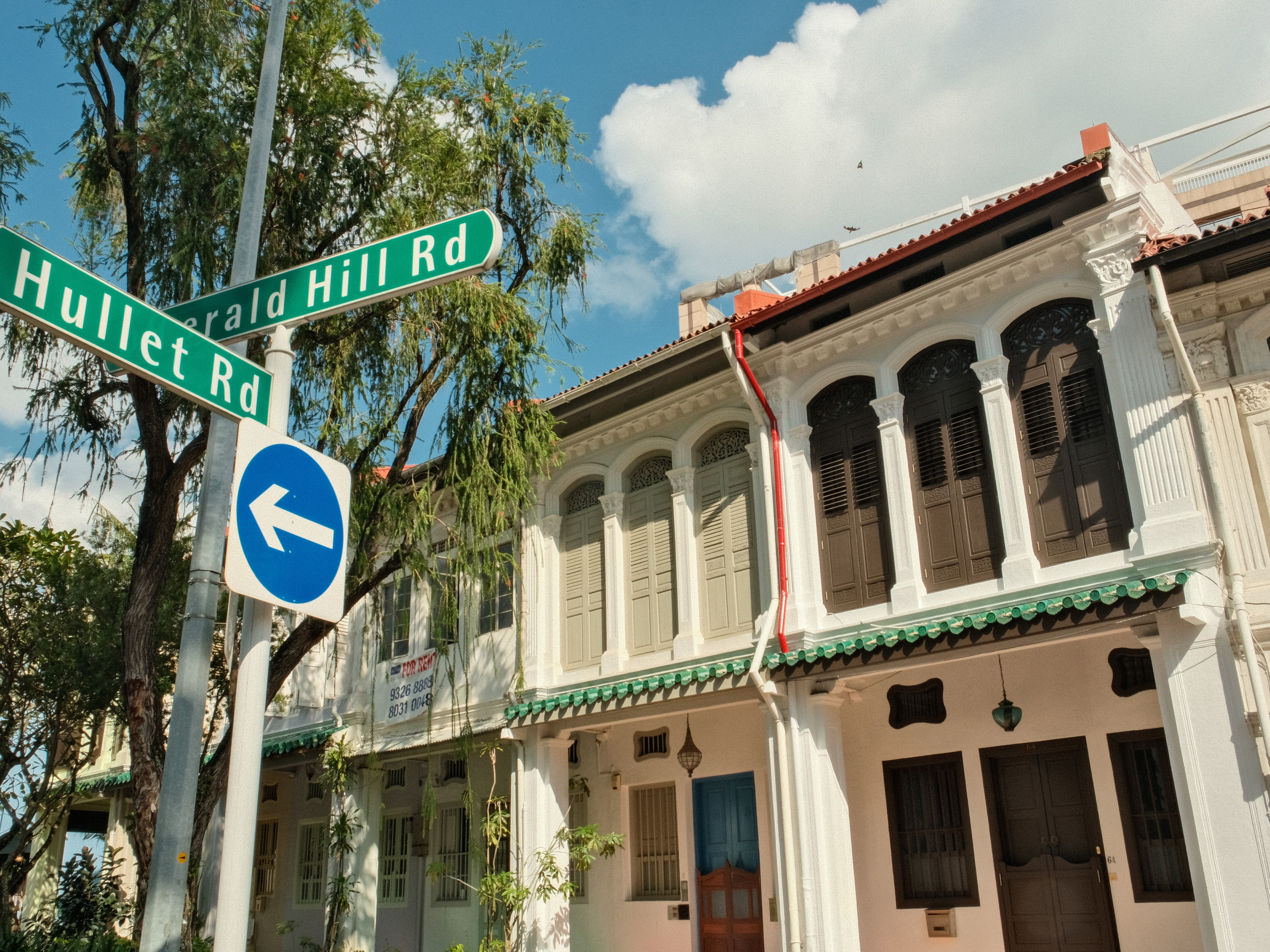
- From top left to right: The Istana, Environment Building, Newton Food Centre, Newton Circus, Scotts Road, Emerald Hill

- Location in Central Region

- Location of Newton within Singapore
- Coordinates: 1°18′25.8″N 103°50′13.2″E
- Country: Singapore
- Region: Central Region
- CDC: Central Singapore CDC
- Town council: Tanjong Pagar Town Council
- Constituency: Tanjong Pagar GRC
- DGP exhibited: 1994
- PA incorporated: 22 January 1999

Government
  - Mayor: Central Singapore CDC: Denise Phua
  - Members of Parliament: Tanjong Pagar GRC: Alvin Tan

Area
  - Total: 2.07 km^{2} (0.80 sq mi)
  - Rank: 45th

Population (2026)
  - Total: 10,390
  - Rank: 32nd
  - Density: 5,020/km^{2} (13,000/sq mi)
  - Rank: 27th
- Demonym: Official: Newton resident
- Postal district: 9

Newton is a town that is located within the Central Area of the Central Region of Singapore. The planning area is bounded by the following planning areas - Orchard and Museum to the south, Tanglin to the west, Novena to the north, Kallang to the northeast and Rochor to the east.

Occupying an area north of the renowned Orchard Road shopping belt, the territory of Newton Planning Area includes the grounds of The Istana, the official residence and office of the President of Singapore. It is split into six subzones; Cairnhill, Goodwood Park, Istana Negara, Monk's Hill, Newton Circus and Orange Grove. Newton's namesake, Newton Road, however, is located within Novena Planning Area, and starts at Newton Circus in the south and ends at the junction with Thomson Road in the north.

== Etymology and history ==
Originally Syed Ali Road, Newton Road was renamed in 1914 after Howard Newton (died 1897), the Assistant Municipal Engineer in late nineteenth century Singapore, in order to avoid confusion with Syed Alwi Road.

In 1933, Newton Circus, a 40-foot (12 m) wide circular carriageway, was constructed for gyratory traffic according to a Singapore Improvement Trust layout at the focus of a number of converging roads, including Bukit Timah Road, Dunearn Road, Newton Road, Keng Lee Road, Kampong Java Road, Bukit Timah Road, Clemenceau Avenue and Scotts Road. As eight roads converge on the Circus, the Tamils used to call Newton ethumuchandi, or "the eight junction place".

Newton Circus has become the site of a major hawker centre, Newton Food Centre.

== See also ==
- Newton MRT station
