= 144 Moulmein Road =

Bungalow in Novena, Singapore

Coordinates: 1°19′10″N 103°50′51″E

144 Moulmein Road is a bungalow on Moulmein Road in Novena, Singapore. It currently houses the Tuberculosis Control Unit.

== Description ==
The single-storey building is elevated above the ground with masonry piers to protect against flooding, as well as to provide additional ventilation. According to the Urban Redevelopment Authority, the building's design is "adapted from traditional South East Asian/Malay architecture." Two "distinctive" octagonal turrets built in the Queen Anne Revival style can be found on either side of the front. The porch features masonry columns of the Doric order. Mouldings around the windows, porch pediment and above the front door depict Chinese bats and coins. The building features the standard Malay house plan, with a verandah, known as a serambi, at the front of the bungalow and a central section, known as a rumah ibu, which leads to the rear section of the bungalow.

== History ==
The house served as the residence of Hakka businessman Lim Soo Ban, who died in December 1952. The Tuberculosis Control Unit of the nearby Tan Tock Seng Hospital moved into the building in the late 1950s. It was also used as a chapel for the staff of the Tan Tock Seng Hospital. It was gazetted for conservation by the Urban Redevelopment Authority on 6 June 2014, along with 142 Moulmein Road and the Former Nurses' Quarters of the hospital.
