= Novena, Singapore =

Planning Area in the Central Region of Singapore

Novena
- Planning Area

Other transcription(s)
  - Chinese: 诺维娜
  - Malay: Novena
  - Tamil: நொவீனா
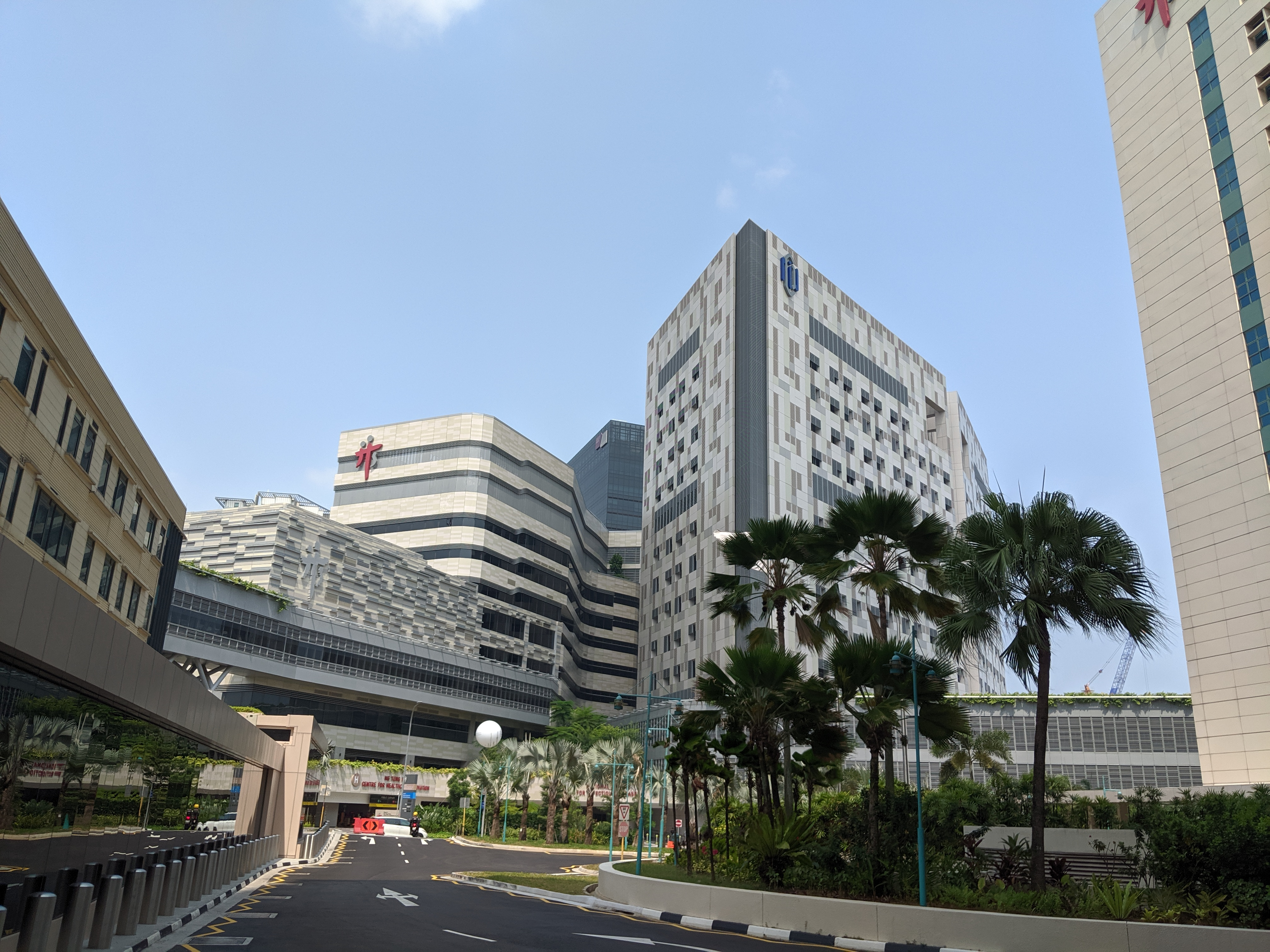
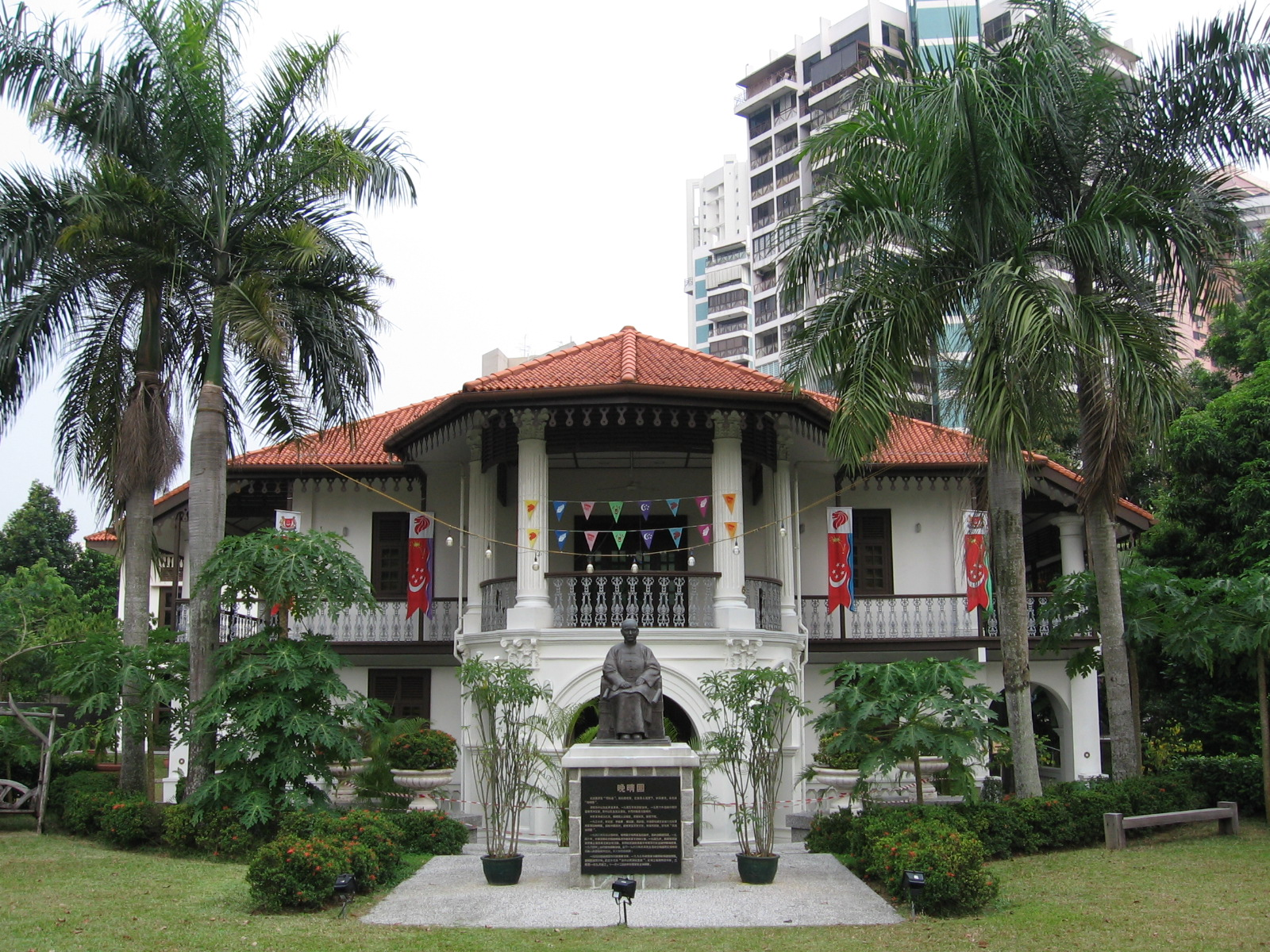
- From top left to right: Aerial view of Novena, Novena Square, the National Centre for Infectious Diseases (NCID), Novena Church, Sun Yat Sen Nanyang Memorial Hall

- Location in Central Region

- Location of Novena within Singapore
- Coordinates: 1°19′15.09″N 103°50′32.75″E
- Country: Singapore
- Region: Central Region
- CDCs: Central Singapore CDC; North West CDC
- Town councils: Bishan-Toa Payoh Town Council; Holland-Bukit Panjang Town Council; Jalan Besar Town Council; Tanjong Pagar Town Council
- Constituencies: Bishan-Toa Payoh GRC; Holland-Bukit Timah GRC; Jalan Besar GRC; Tanjong Pagar GRC
- DGP exhibited: 1995
- PA incorporated: 22 January 1999

Government
  - Mayors: Central Singapore CDC: Denise Phua; North West CDC: Alex Yam
  - Members of Parliament: Bishan-Toa Payoh GRC: Chee Hong Tat; Holland-Bukit Timah GRC: Sim Ann; Jalan Besar GRC: Shawn Loh; Denise Phua; Tanjong Pagar GRC: Alvin Tan

Area
  - Total: 8.97 km^{2} (3.46 sq mi)
  - Rank: 33rd

Population (2026)
  - Total: 53,930
  - Rank: 25th
  - Density: 6,010/km^{2} (15,600/sq mi)
  - Rank: 26th
- Demonym: Official: Novena resident

Ethnic groups (2020)
  - Chinese: 40,720
  - Malays: 1,730
  - Indians: 4,140
  - Others: 2,740
- Postal district: 8, 11, 12

Novena (IPA: /noʊˈviːnə, -nɑː/ noh-VEE-nə) is a planning area located within the Central Region of Singapore. Novena is bounded by Toa Payoh to the north, Bukit Timah to the west, Tanglin to the south and Kallang to the east. It comprises five subzones, namely Balestier, Dunearn, Malcolm, Mount Pleasant and Moulmein.

While Novena is not classified as a "new town" by the Housing and Development Board (HDB), the estate of Whampoa within the subzone of Balestier constitutes part of the Kallang/Whampoa New Town.

The vicinity is named after the Novena prayer devotions to Our Mother of Perpetual Help, originally established by the Redemptorist Order that settled and propagated within the area. In later years, the Tan Tock Seng Hospital was set in 1844, one of the oldest and busiest hospitals in Singapore.

== Etymology ==
Novena and its associated roads, buildings and Mass Rapid Transit station are named after Novena Church (canonically the Church of Saint Alphonsus Liguori) located in the area.

Balestier Road was named after Joseph Balestier, an American diplomat who served in Singapore in the 1800s.

== Infrastructure ==
=== Housing ===
Land in Novena is very expensive because of its close proximity to the Central Area. There are few HDB flats in Novena; most houses in the area are condominiums or private housing.

=== Healthcare ===
Novena is home to the largest concentration of hospitals and medical centres in Singapore.

An integrated academic medical complex termed HealthCity Novena, is centred around Tan Tock Seng Hospital, and supported by step-down facilities such as the Integrated Care Hub, Ren Ci Hospital and Dover Park Hospice as well tertiary national medical centres including the National Centre for Infectious Diseases, National Neuroscience Institute and National Skin Centre. The Clinical Sciences Building of the Lee Kong Chian School of Medicine and various leisure and public spaces complete the complex.

A number of private healthcare providers are situated next to Tan Tock Seng Hospital. The private cluster is anchored by Mount Elizabeth Novena Hospital, with standalone outpatient clinics leveraging on network effects setting up in Novena Medical Centre, Novena Specialist Centre and Royal Square Novena.

=== Commercial ===
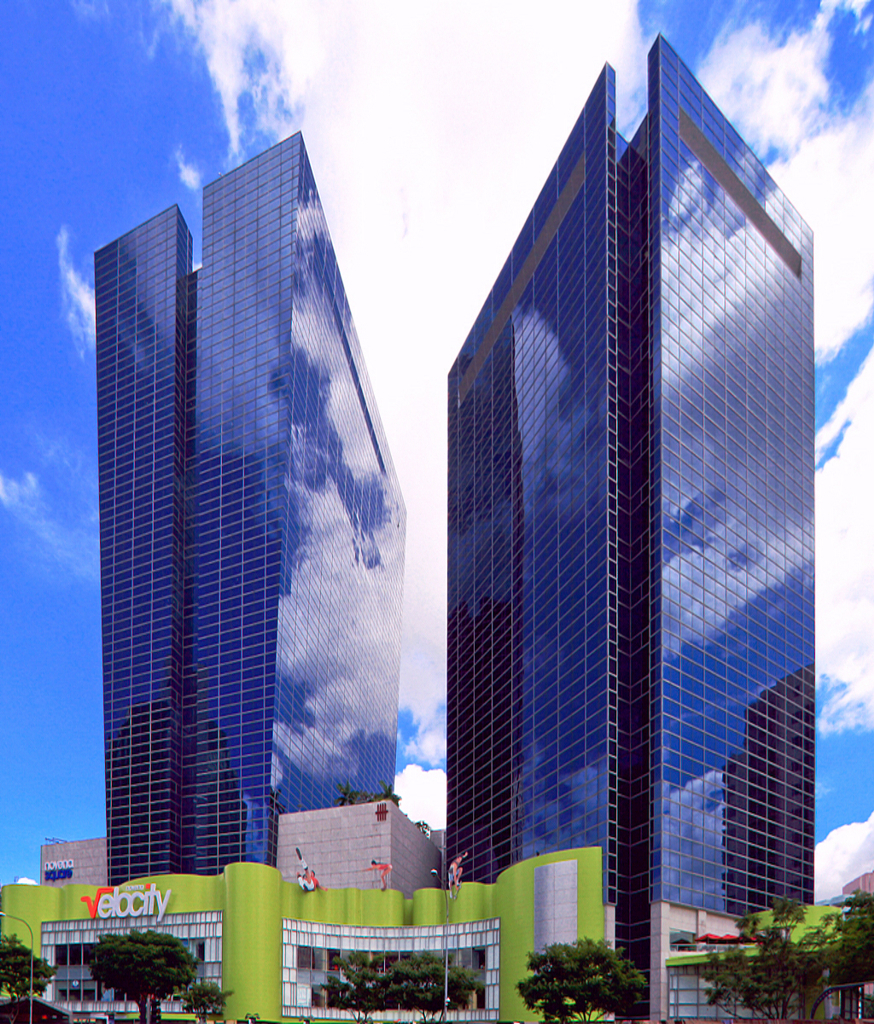
VeloCity@Novena Square and Square 2/Novena Medical Centre

Central to this area is Novena Square, a mixed used development situated directly above the Novena MRT station. Novena Medical Centre is located at levels 8 to 11 of the Square 2 shopping centre. Adjacent to Novena Square's Office Tower is a sports-themed mall called Novena Velocity. Opposite Novena Square, and across the Junction of Newton Road, Moulmein Road and Thomson Road, is United Square Shopping Mall, a children-oriented mall, with shops catering to infants, kids and parents.

==== Novena Square ====
Velocity@Novena Square, formerly known as Novena Square, is a sports and lifestyle mall with a new building extension. It lies directly above Novena MRT station. It was opened in December 2000, and owned by Novena Square Investments. There are 160 stores and spans 3 floors.

==== Square 2 ====
Square 2 is located at the Novena MRT station. It was opened on 10 December 2007, and it is developed and owned by Far East Organization. It has over 180 specialty stores, selling food and beverage, fashion and accessories, education and enrichment, as well as beauty & wellness services, spanning five floors.

== Education ==
Novena has a total of three primary schools, three secondary schools, three private schools and two schools offering tertiary education as of 2024. The list is as follows:

=== Primary schools ===
- Anglo-Chinese School (Primary)
- St. Joseph's Institution Junior
- Singapore Chinese Girls' School (Primary school section)

=== Secondary schools ===
- Anglo-Chinese School (Barker Road)
- St. Joseph's Institution
- Singapore Chinese Girls' School (Secondary school section)

=== Tertiary institutions ===
- Catholic Junior College
- St. Joseph's Institution (Junior College section)

=== Other schools ===
- Beacon International College
- San Yu Adventist School

== Transportation ==
Novena is accessible by MRT, with buses serving the city, nearest neighbouring estates and is close proximity to the expressway. The area has no bus interchange, the nearest being in Toa Payoh. However, Saint Michael's Bus Terminal can be found along Balestier.

== See also ==
- Balestier Road
- 144 Moulmein Road
- Farrer Park
- Whampoa
