= Novena MRT station =

Mass Rapid Transit station in Singapore

Novena NS20 诺维娜 நொவீனா
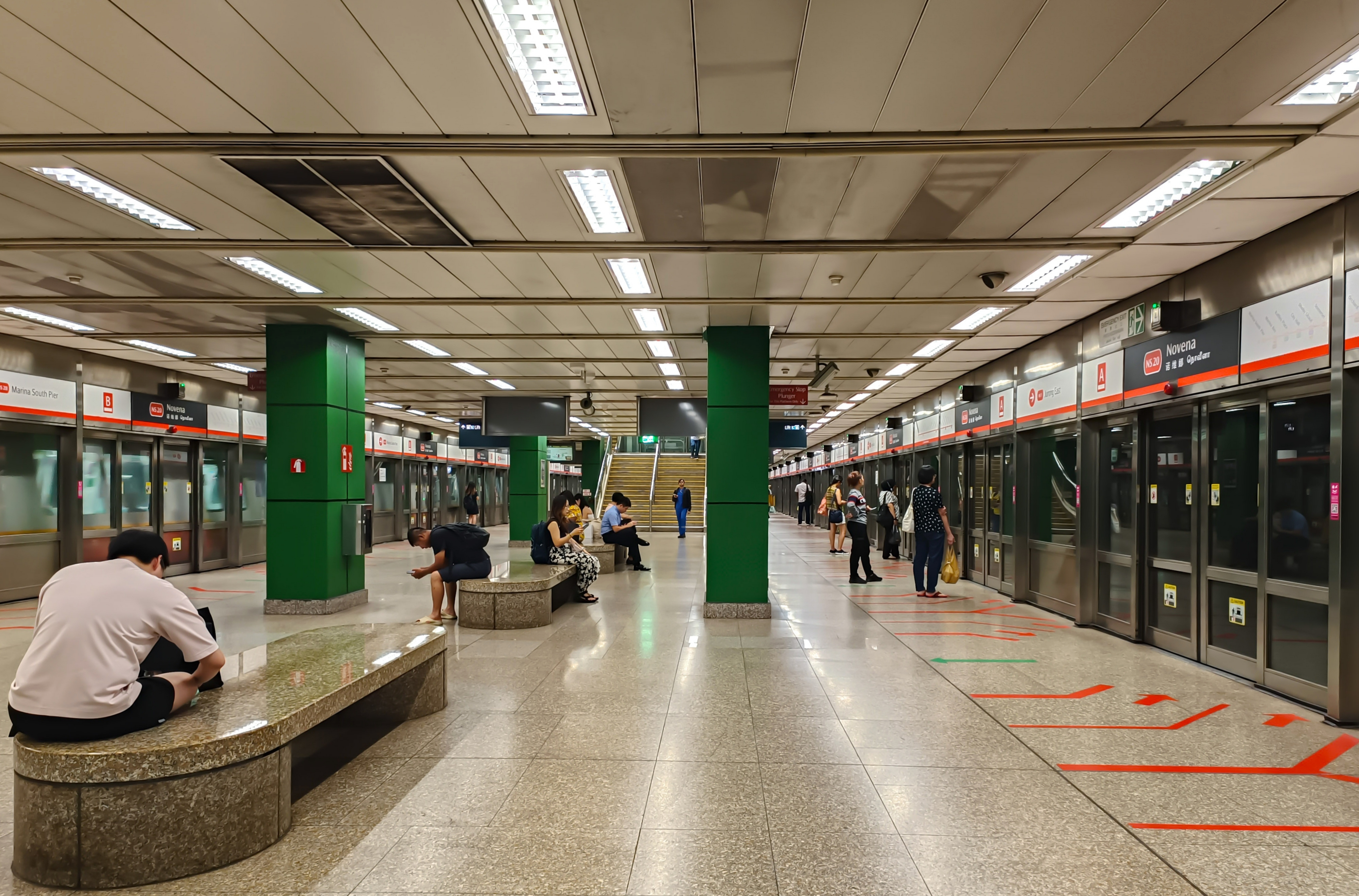
- Platform level of Novena MRT station.

General information
- Location: 250 Thomson Road, Singapore 307642
- Coordinates: 01°19′13.42″N 103°50′37.28″E
- System: Mass Rapid Transit (MRT) station
- Owner: Land Transport Authority
- Operator: SMRT Trains
- Line: North–South Line
- Platforms: 2 (1 island platform)
- Tracks: 2
- Connections: Bus, Taxi

Construction
- Structure type: Underground
- Platform levels: 1
- Parking: Yes (Novena Square, Square 2, United Square)
- Accessible: Yes

Other information
- Station code: NOV

History
- Opened: 12 December 1987; 38 years ago
- Former names: Thomson

Passengers
- June 2024: 34,023 per day

Services
Preceding station	Mass Rapid Transit	Following station
Toa Payoh towards Jurong East	North–South Line	Newton towards Marina South Pier
Track layout
Location
- Location within Singapore Rail central area

Novena MRT station is an underground Mass Rapid Transit (MRT) station on the North–South Line. Located along Thomson Road in Novena, Singapore, the station is located near landmarks such as Tan Tock Seng Hospital, Mount Elizabeth Novena Hospital and United Square. Planned as part of Phase One of the MRT system, under the working name Thomson, the station's name was changed to Novena in November 1982, after the Novena Church. Construction of the station commenced in January 1984, and the station opened in December 1987.

== History ==
Novena station was included in the early plans of the MRT network published in May 1982 as Thomson. The first confirmation that the station would be among the Phase I stations (from Ang Mo Kio to Marina Bay) came in November that year, where it was renamed to Novena as it would be near the Novena Church. It was expected in December 1982 that tenderers will be called in early 1983, construction will start by mid 1983, and operations to start in 1987 for the Phase I stations. This segment was given priority as it passed through areas that had a higher demand for public transport, such as the densely populated housing estates of Toa Payoh and Ang Mo Kio and the Central Area. The line aimed to relieve the traffic congestion on the Thomson–Sembawang road corridor.

By February 1983, it was reported by The Straits Times that the design for Novena, along with Toa Payoh and Orchard Boulevard, were almost ready. In October 1983, Contract 104 for the construction of the Novena and Toa Payoh stations, and the tunnels between Toa Payoh and Newton stations, was awarded to two Japanese contractors, Tobishima and Takenaka. Construction of the station began in January 1984, and the station was built from the bottom up. In 1984, a Jewish cemetery along Thomson Road was cleared to make way for the station, with the graves reinterred in Choa Chu Kang, and to prevent soil subsidence, the tunnels connecting Novena and Newton were built in compressed air.

In June 1985, a worker was killed at the station site after receiving head injuries from being struck by moving components of a tunnel boring machine. Novena station opened on 12 December 1987, as part of the extension of the MRT system to Outram Park.

In April 2002, a lift connecting the concourse with the street level above was opened. Originally, the station's distinctive features are bright green wall tiles.

== Station details ==
=== Etymology ===
The station takes its name from the Novena Church, which it is close to.

=== Location and services ===
The station is located between Thomson Road and Sinaran Drive, underneath Novena Square. It is in proximity to Tan Tock Seng Hospital, Mount Elizabeth Novena Hospital, Revenue House, United Square and Square 2. The station serves the North–South Line, and is located between Toa Payoh and Newton stations, with the station code NS20, formerly N5.

=== Design ===
Novena station's design is similar to that of Toa Payoh station, with a gross area of 8,000 square metres (86,000 sq ft) and two levels, reaching a depth of 15 metres (49 ft). The upper level acts as the station's concourse, and is used for ticketing control, while the lower-level houses the station's platforms. The station also contains walls clad in white tiles, and pillars that are emerald green.

When the station first opened, it included a sunken plaza, along with a landscaped pedestrian mall. The station's exits also were fitted with a steel honeycomb-like framework.

As a part of the heritage-themed comic connect by SMRT, the station features a mural by local artist David Liew. It depicts the Novena Church (The Church of St. Alphonsus), the former Jewish cemetery that was cleared for the station, Middleton Hospital (formerly called the Government Infectious Disease Hospital, and the Tan Tock Seng Hospital, as well as historical figures such as American Consul Joseph Balestier and merchants Hoo Ah Kay, Seah Liang Seah, and Tan Tock Seng.

=== Cultural impact ===
The station is one of the MRT stations in Singapore rumoured to be haunted, possibly because the area used to be the site of a Jewish cemetery.
