= National Centre for Infectious Diseases =

Specialised hospital in Singapore

- Ministry of Health (Singapore)

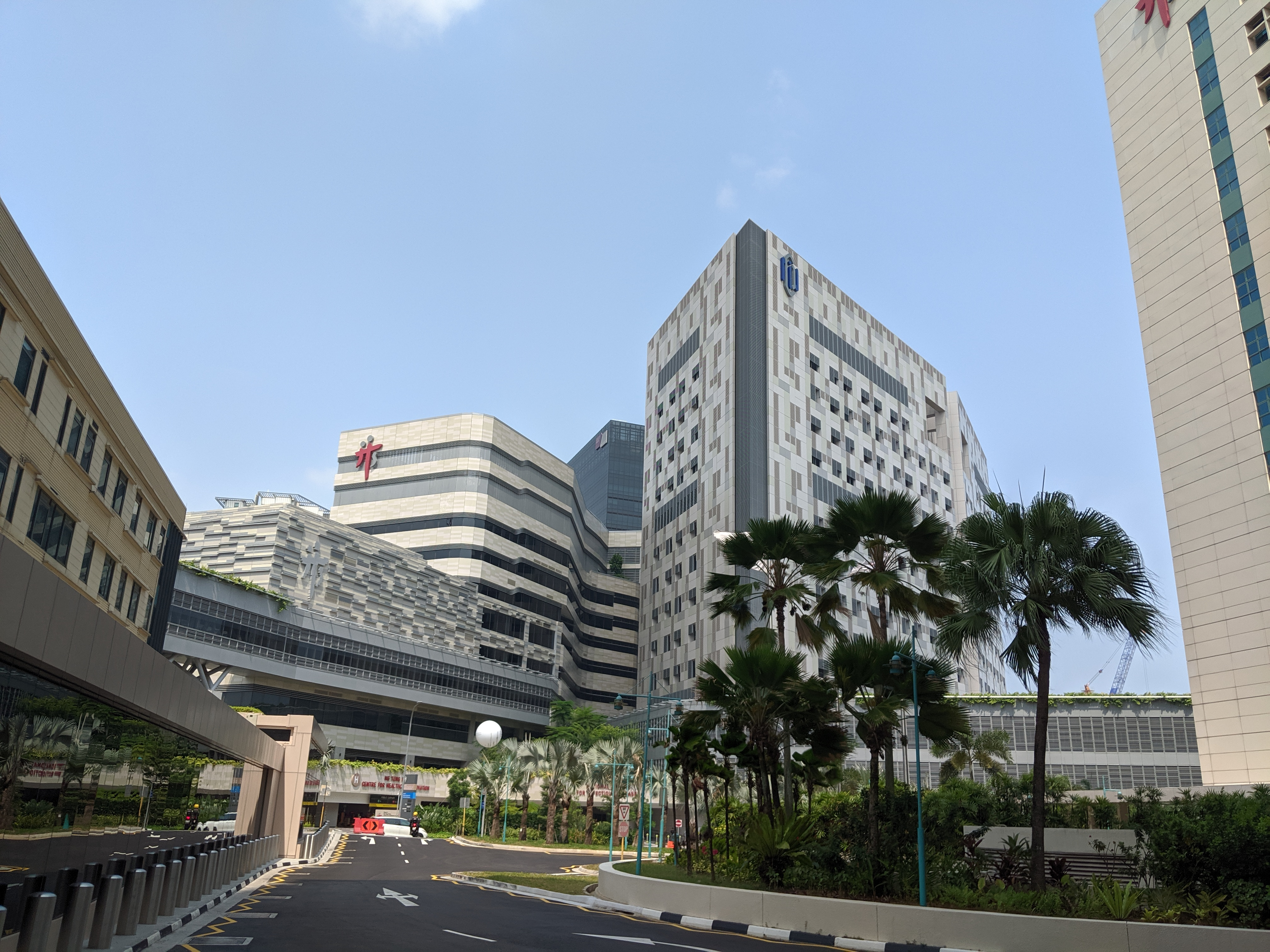
- A view of the National Centre for Infectious Diseases and Centre for Healthcare Innovation

Geography
- Location: 16 Jalan Tan Tock Seng, Singapore 308442, Singapore
- Coordinates: 1°19′13″N 103°51′3″E

Organisation
- Care system: Public

Services
- Beds: 330 (500 during outbreaks)

History
- Founded: 7 September 2019; 6 years ago

Links
- Website: ncid.sg

The National Centre for Infectious Diseases (Abbreviation: NCID; Malay: Pusat Nasional bagi Penyakit Berjangkit; Tamil: தேசிய தொற்றுநோய் மையம்; Chinese: 国家传染病中心), previously known as the Communicable Disease Centre (Abbreviation: CDC), is a national public health institute under the Ministry of Health of Singapore. Located next to Tan Tock Seng Hospital in Novena, all patients within the city-state who are affected with a highly contagious disease are also quarantined at the NCID and is used to control an outbreak of such diseases. The executive director of the hospital is Professor Yee-Sin Leo.

== History ==
Prior to the establishment of a quarantine facility at Moulmein Road, there existed a quarantine camp at Balestier in 1907. Opened in 1913, the quarantine facility at Moulmein Road was initially known as the Isolation Hospital. It was later renamed to the Middleton Hospital in 1920, in recognition of Dr. W.R.C Middleton, who had served the hospital for 27 years, upon his retirement. The centre became a branch of Tan Tock Seng Hospital (TTSH) in 1985, was renamed the Communicable Disease Centre (CDC), and came under the management of the National Healthcare Group. On 1 April 1995, it came under TTSH's direct administration.

In March 2003, CDC was the central point of Severe acute respiratory syndrome (SARS) outbreak in Singapore. As fully isolated rooms were limited, existing HIV patients had to be moved elsewhere within the centre while patients with skin conditions had to be discharged to make way to quarantine suspected SARS patient. As the outbreak wore on, TTSH took over as the main hospital to quarantine and treat SARS patients on 22 March 2003.

On 13 August 2003, an existing TTSH block adjacent to the CDC was renovated to be used as containment wards and served as CDC 2. This block was initially refurnished for Ren Ci Community Hospital, the SARS outbreak put a break to the plan.

On 13 December 2018, CDC ceased operations as a medical facility, concluding its 111 years of operations. All operations moved to the National Centre for Infectious Diseases, a new building opposite the main Tan Tock Seng Hospital building. Operational in May 2019, the new facility has a 330-bed capacity and is designed to manage an outbreak the size of the SARS outbreak.

On 7 September 2019, the National Centre for Infectious Diseases was officially opened by Minister for Health Gan Kim Yong. It has state-of-the-art technologies and tracks patients in the building to prevent the spread of outbreaks. In addition, the building houses Singapore's first high-level isolation unit for highly contagious, even lethal diseases like Ebola.

The NCID was used as an isolation facility for patients infected with COVID-19 during the COVID-19 pandemic.

== Access ==
The medical facility is located close to Novena MRT station on the North South line.

== See also ==
- Healthcare in Singapore
- Health in Singapore
