= Newton Food Centre =

Hawker centre in Newton, Singapore

- 纽顿熟食中心 (Chinese); Pusat Makanan Newton (Malay) நியூட்டன் உணவு மையம் (Tamil)
- Interactive map of the Newton Food Centre area
- Former names: Newton Circus Hawker Centre (1971–2005)

General information
- Location: Newton, Singapore, 500 Clemenceau Avenue North; Singapore 229495
- Coordinates: 1°18′43″N 103°50′22″E
- Opened: 1 January 1971; 55 years ago
- Renovated: 1 July 2006; 20 years ago
- Cost: S$96,800
- Renovation cost: S$4.8 million
- Landlord: National Environment Agency

Technical details
- Floor area: 3,130.53 m^{2} (33,696.7 sq ft)

Renovating team
- Architect: CPG Consultants

Other information
- Number of stores: 83
- Public transit: NS21 — DT11 Newton

Newton Food Centre is a hawker centre in Newton, at the intersection of Newton Circus and Clemenceau Avenue North.

The food centre was promoted by the Singapore Tourism Board (STB) as a tourist attraction for sampling Singaporean cuisine. It was first opened in 1971 and it closed down in 2005 as the government wanted to revamp the food centre. The food centre then went through a major renovation before reopening on 1 July 2006.

Newton Food Centre remains as one of the most popular hawker centres in Singapore. Some stalls have also been featured in the Michelin Guide.

== History ==
=== Newton Circus Hawker Centre (1971–2005) ===
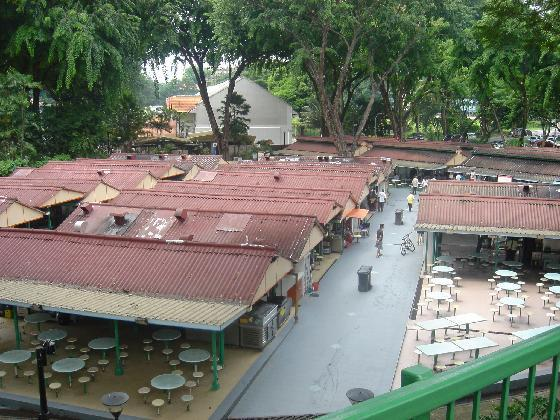
Newton before the renovations

Newton Food Hawker Centre was one of the first two hawker centres built by the Government to house illegal street hawkers, with the other being Adam Road Food Centre. Construction began in November 1970 at a cost of S$96,800, and officially opened in January 1971. Newton housed 56 hawkers who previously operated along Bukit Timah Road, without proper hygiene facilities.

On 13 October 1976, the Ministry of Environment announced a S$110,000 extension plan to house 32 more hawkers, bringing the total number of stalls to 88.

Due to its close proximity to the city, many tourists patronised Newton. However, incidents of serving only tourists and overcharging rose gradually. In December 1988, hawkers were warned that they have to serve all customers equally, or be answerable to the Ministry of Environment. In November 1991, a stall made the headlines after showing two sets of prices for the same dishes — $3, $4, $5 beside the signage, and $6, $8, $10 in Japanese. The stallowner claimed that the dishes and portions were different, hence the different set of prices. In December 1992, an Indonesian tourist wrote in to The New Paper detailing his overcharging experience at Newton:

I am an Indonesian tourist, and had an experience I never thought I'd have in Singapore. On Nov 28, I was at Newton Circus Hawker Centre and saw a stall sign stating that mee goreng and mee rebus were being sold at $2 each. I ordered one packet of each for take-away.
Imagine my surprise when the stallholder rudely told me: "We only sell mee goreng at $3. You can go to the other stall to buy if you can only afford $2 a packet."
He even repeated this to make sure that I had heard what he said. I was shocked, but a Malaysian tourist standing near me confirmed that he had been treated the same way.
The stallholder could have simply said the price was not as stated; I would not have had a problem paying the extra $1. But I never expected such rudeness.
This can be bad for Singapore's image if it is allowed to continue.

On 14 October 1994, the Urban Redevelopment Authority (URA) announced plans to demolish the hawker centre to ease traffic congestion at Newton Circus and develop high-density residential properties. Members of the public and hawkers voiced concern and pleaded URA to reconsider the plans. On 30 April 2004, Member of Parliament for Tanglin–Cairnhill Indranee Rajah announced the closure of Newton for a major renovation, effectively shelving the plans by URA.

=== Newton Food Centre ===
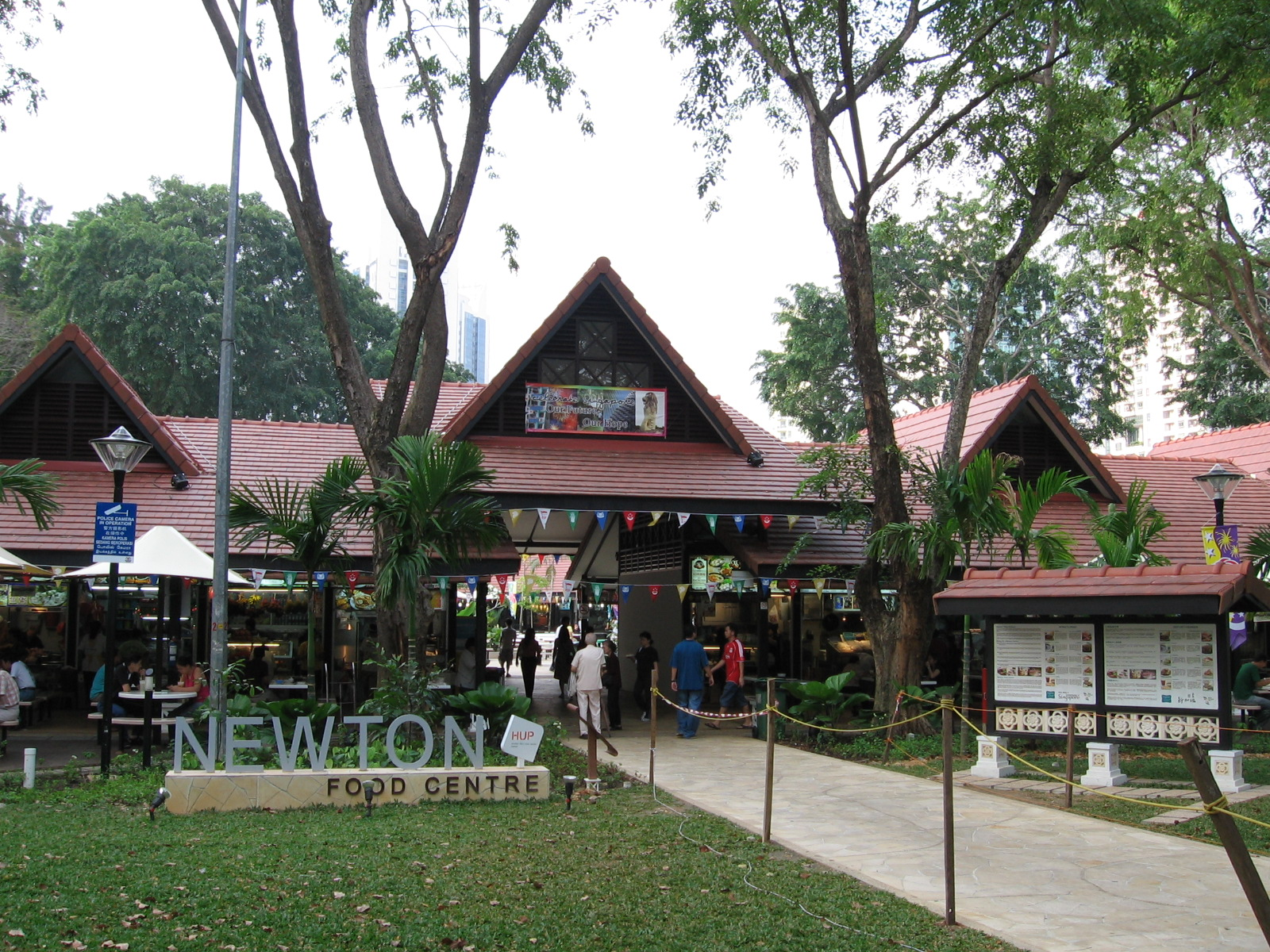
Newton in 2006

Costing S$4.8 million, Newton Circus Hawker Centre reopened as Newton Food Centre on 1 July 2006, housing 83 hawkers.

== Controversies ==
Despite being promoted by the Singapore Tourism Board for sampling Singaporean cuisine, Newton Food Centre is often criticised by locals for overpricing and mediocre food quality. Past issues such as incessant touting, overcharging and harassment of customers by over-zealous stall owners still remained.

On 14 March 2009, six American tourists were charged S$491 for a meal at Tanglin's Best BBQ Seafood. In this case of flagrant overcharging, The National Environment Agency imposed a 3-month ban on the stall and banned his assistant from working there for one year.

== In popular culture ==
Newton Food Centre was shown in the 2018 film Crazy Rich Asians.

== See also ==
- Hawker centre
- Singaporean cuisine
