= Howard Newton (engineer) =

Alfred Howard Vincent Newton (13 January 1852 – 27 July 1897) was the Assistant Engineer to the Singapore Municipality from 1877 to 1896, and later Acting Deputy Executive Engineer for Waterworks of Bombay.

== Early life and education ==
Newton was born on 13 January 1852 in London as the fourth son of civil engineer William Edward Newton. He was educated at King's College London, where he won the Daniell Chemical Scholarship. After attending the school, he was articled by his father.

== Career ==
He was employed by Henry Young Darracott Scott to carry out experiments in connection with sewage works at Leeds, Bolton and Nottingham.

He was appointed the Assistant Engineer to the Singapore Municipality in 1877. Then Governor of the Straits Settlements Frederick Weld strongly supported his candidature for the post. He was made an Associate Member of the Institution of Civil Engineers on 6 April 1880. Due to the declining health and later death of fellow municipal engineer James MacRitchie, he had to carry on work single-handed. He erected various iron and steel bridges, water-supply buildings, public buildings and drainage and reclamation works on the island and designed bridges for private firms. He studied bridge construction and the testing of materials at the University of Sydney for six months in 1896 while on leave.

In 1896, he was selected for the post of Acting Deputy Executive Engineer for Waterworks of Bombay, after which he was succeeded by Samuel Tomlinson, who was previously the Water Engineer of Bombay. He sailed for Bombay on 25 August. He was made a full member of the Institution of Civil Engineers on 2 March 1897.

== Personal life and death ==
Newton was married to Elizabeth Newton. They had four children. His eldest daughter, Maude, married William Joseph Mayson on 1 November 1906. It was suggested that the strain of handling the work meant for both him and MacRitchie following the latter's decline in health caused Newton's own health to deteriorate. Newton died from cholera on 27 July 1897 after having developed symptoms of cholera the day prior.

== Legacy ==
Newton Circus, originally known as Syed Ali Road, was renamed after Newton to avoid confusion with Syed Alwi Road.
