= Newton MRT station =

Mass Rapid Transit station in Singapore

Newton NS21 – DT11 纽顿 நியூட்டன்
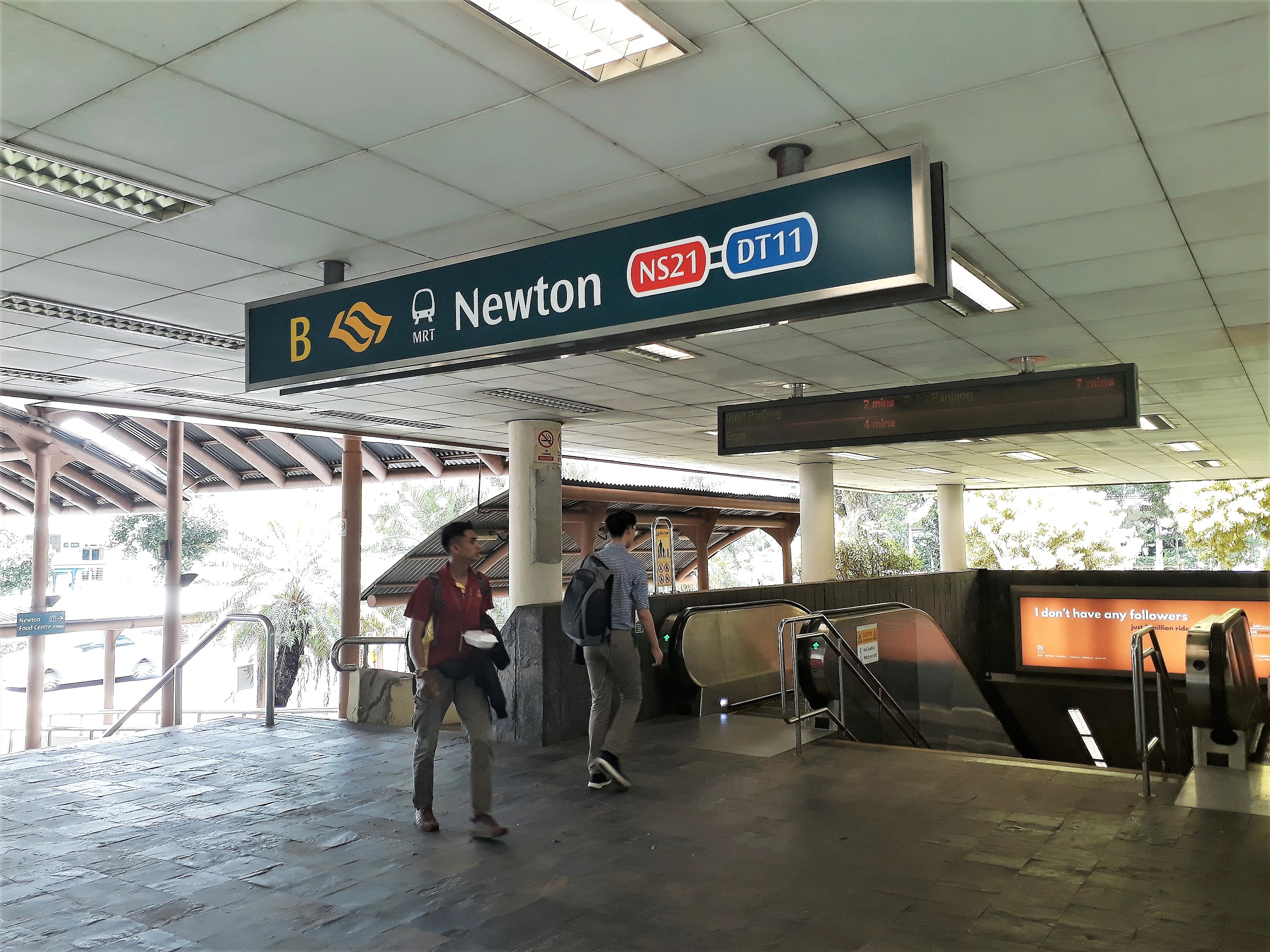
- Exit B of Newton MRT station

General information
- Location: 49 Scotts Road, Singapore 228234 (NSL); 235 Bukit Timah Road, Singapore 229901 (DTL)
- Coordinates: 01°18′47″N 103°50′18″E
- System: Mass Rapid Transit (MRT) interchange
- Owner: Land Transport Authority
- Operator: SMRT Trains (North–South Line); SBS Transit (Downtown Line)
- Line: North–South Line Downtown Line
- Platforms: 4 (2 island platforms)
- Tracks: 4
- Connections: Bus, Taxi

Construction
- Structure type: Underground
- Platform levels: 2
- Parking: Yes (external)
- Cycle facilities: Yes
- Accessible: Yes

Other information
- Station code: NEW

History
- Opened: 12 December 1987; 38 years ago (North–South Line); 27 December 2015; 10 years ago (Downtown Line)
- Former names: Newton Circus

Passengers
- June 2024: 50,863 per day

Services
Preceding station	Mass Rapid Transit	Following station
Novena towards Jurong East	North–South Line	Orchard towards Marina South Pier
Stevens towards Bukit Panjang	Downtown Line	Little India towards Expo
Track layout
Location
- Location within Singapore Rail central area

Newton MRT station is an underground Mass Rapid Transit (MRT) interchange station on the North–South (NSL) and Downtown (DTL) lines. It is located in Newton, Singapore, at the junction of Scotts Road and Bukit Timah Road near Newton Circus. The station serves the offices and condominiums around Newton Circus including Goldbell Towers and Scotts Highpark, and it is within walking distance to the Newton Food Centre.

The NSL station opened on 12 December 1987 as part of the line's extension to Outram Park via Raffles Place station. The NSL station is designated as a Civil Defence Shelter with a reinforced structure. With the opening of DTL Stage 2 on 27 December 2015, Newton became an interchange station. An additional entrance, designed by SAA Architects, serves the new DTL station, which features an artwork Newton by Messymsxi as part of the network's Art-in-Transit programme.

== History ==
=== North–South Line ===
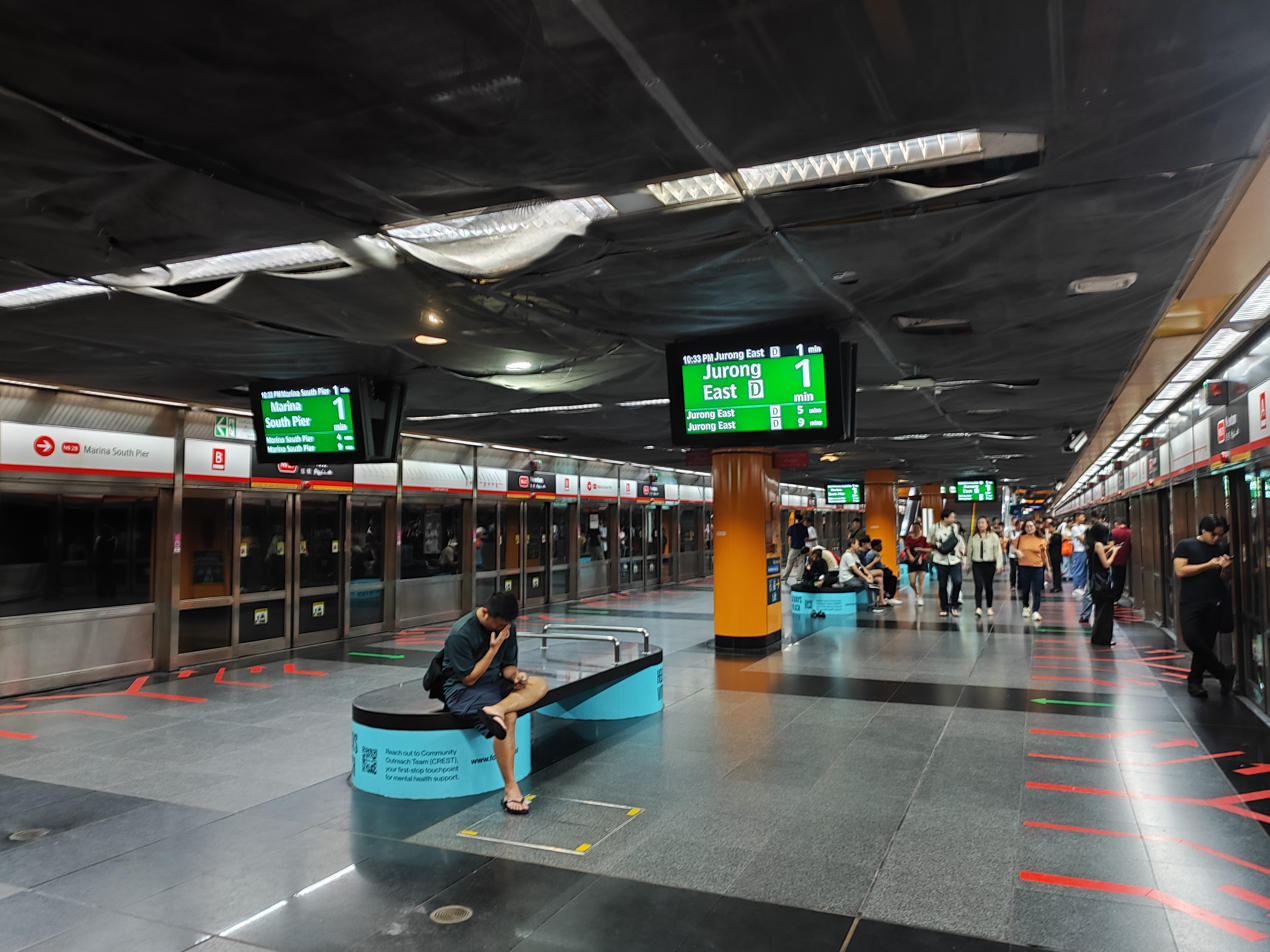
NSL platforms of the station (Platforms A and B)

The contract for the design and construction of Newton Circus station was awarded to a joint venture between French Dregages et Travaux Publics and Sembawang Shipyard at S$43 million (US$20.2 million) in January 1984. The station was one of the stations on the line designated as a Civil Defence Shelter. To facilitate the construction, the segment of Scotts Road from Newton Circus to Orchard Road had to be diverted for about 28 months. In September, the station name was shortened to "Newton", and the site was shifted slightly towards Scotts Road instead of being underneath Newton Circus. On 21 May 1985, Newton station was one of four stations affected by flooding in the area.

During the construction, jet grouting was used to strengthen the soil, which required lane closures along Scotts Road. This was to address the varying ground conditions around the site. Voids were also discovered during the construction (on 21 October 1985 and 18 May 1986), which led the closure of Scotts Road for safety reasons.

The station had an open house on 14 and 15 November 1987, which drew small crowds of about 1,200 people on the first day of its preview. The station opened for service on 12 December when the line extension to Outram Park station was completed. In light of the extension, a new bus stop along Scotts Road was built to serve commuters at the station.

=== Downtown Line ===
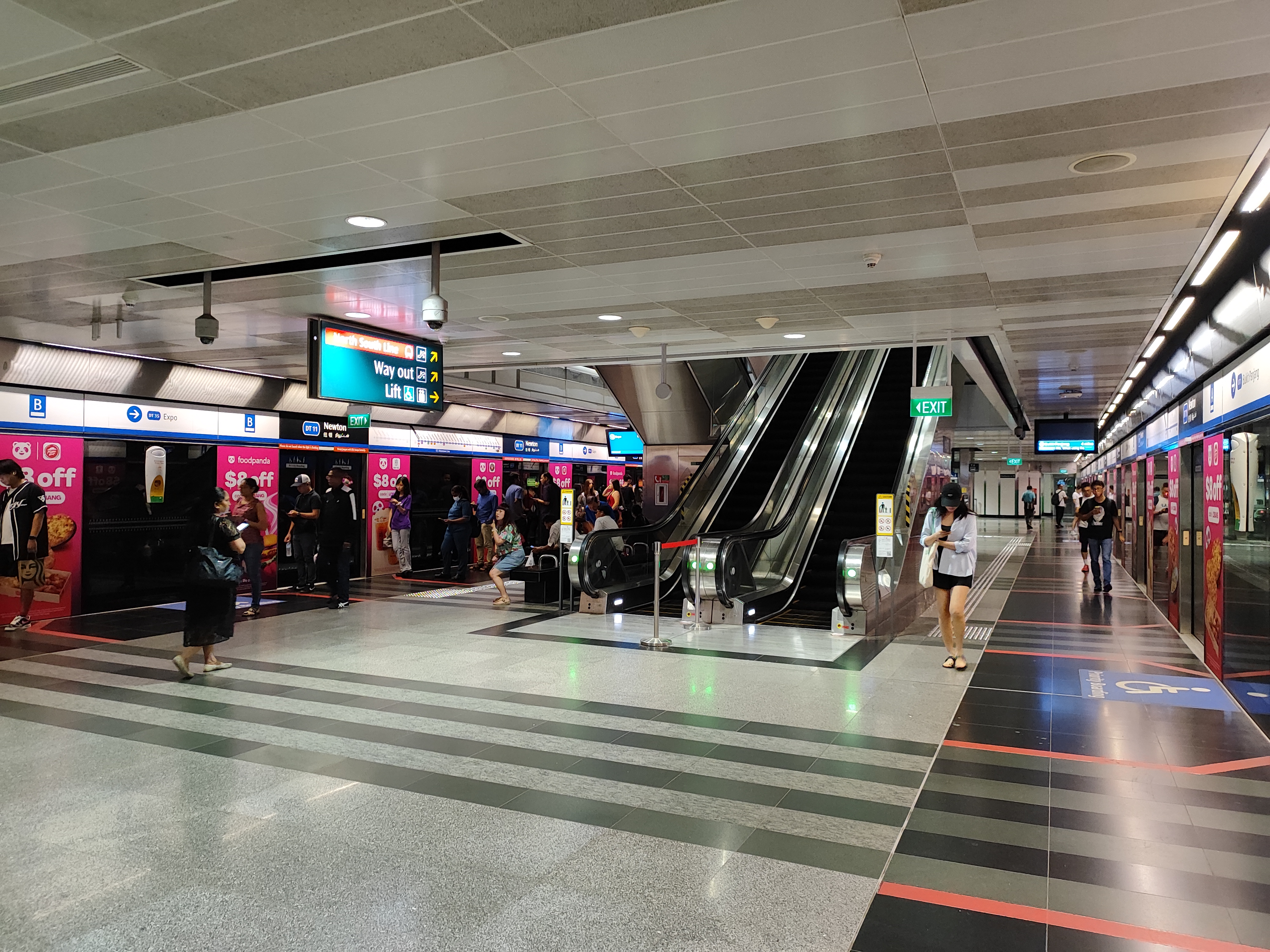
DTL platforms of the station (Platforms A and B)

The station was first announced to be an interchange station with the DTL when the DTL2 (Downtown Line Stage 2) stations were unveiled on 15 July 2008. Contract 920 for the design and construction of Newton station and tunnels was awarded to Shanghai Tunnel Engineering Co. Ltd at a contract value of S$355.7 million (US$244.5 million) in September 2009. Construction of the station was targeted to complete by 2015. Four 6.35-metre (20.8 ft) diameter EPS machines were used to construct the bored tunnels. The station opened on 27 December 2015 along with the other DTL2 stations.

As part of Exercise Station Guard 2018, on 14 February 2018, the DTL station implemented security measures such as X-ray machines and walk-through metal detectors for screening commuters. The exercise was part of the emergency preparedness ground deployment exercise, to "test and validate" Singapore's readiness when security measures were enhanced during a national threat. In addition, the exercise also allowed the operator SBS Transit to review their security measures. From November to December 2024, the station was part of a scenting trial run alongside other select DTL stations, in a collaboration with Lynk Fragrances. The scent, consisting of fig and eucalyptus, is lightly sprayed through diffusers.

=== Incidents ===
On the morning of 13 February 2013, a fire broke out in an MRT tunnel just metres from the station, which disrupted train services on the NSL for over two hours and affected around 15,000 commuters. The fire was caused by the short-circuiting of an electric cable 5 metres (16 ft) away from the station. Initially put out by the staff using a fire extinguisher, the fire reignited and caused smoke from the tunnel to travel to the station. The Singapore Civil Defence Force arrived at the station and managed to put it out. No one was injured during the incident.

On 7 and 8 October 2017, this station was the temporary terminus for northbound trains from Marina South Pier station during the Bishan tunnel flooding, while services were suspended between the Ang Mo Kio and Newton stations. Normal services on the NSL resumed at around 2 pm on 8 October 2017.

== Station details ==
=== Location ===
Newton station is located near Newton Circus. The NSL station is located underneath Scotts Road, while the DTL station is situated close to Newton Flyover and Bukit Timah Road. The station is close to the offices of Prudential and the UOB-Kay Hian Bank and other developments such as Balmoral Plaza, Goldbell Towers, Scotts Highpark, Sheraton Towers and Cairnhill Community Club. It also serves the Newton Food Centre and educational institutions such as Ascott Center for Excellence, Anglo-Chinese School (Primary), Anglo-Chinese School (Barker Road) and the Alliance Francaise De Singapour.

=== Services ===
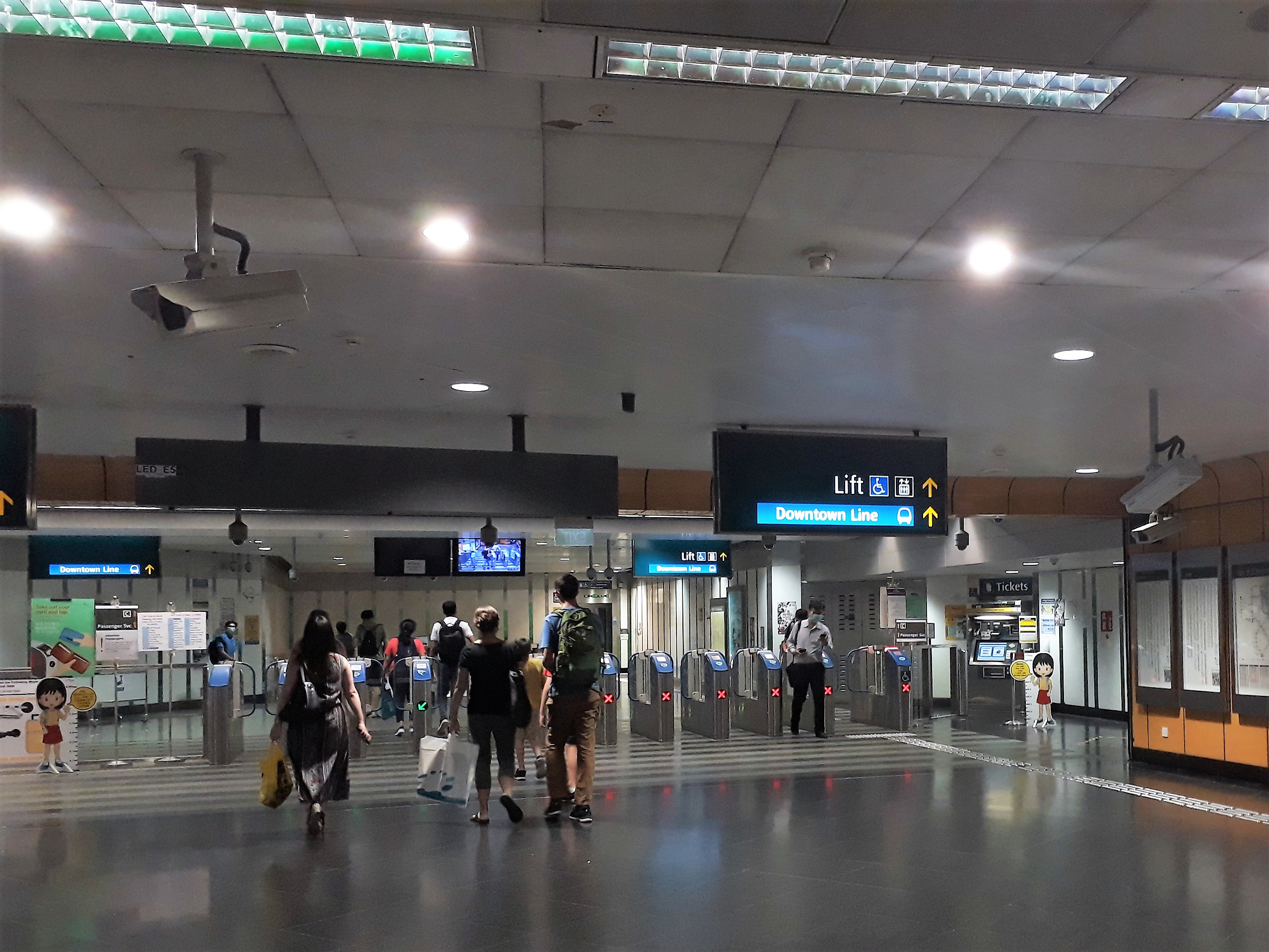
Concourse leading to the DTL platforms

Newton station is an interchange station between the North–South and Downtown lines. On the NSL, the station is between the Novena and Orchard stations, while on the DTL it is between the Stevens and Little India stations. The station codes, separate for each line, are NS21 (formerly N4) and DT11 as reflected on official maps.

The DTL station is not directly connected to the NSL station and hence commuters have to exit from either of the stations to transfer to another line via the 56-metre (184 ft) underpass that connects the two existing exits along Scotts Road. The transfer is considered a "valid transfer" of a "journey" as long as it does not exceed 15 minutes.

=== Design ===
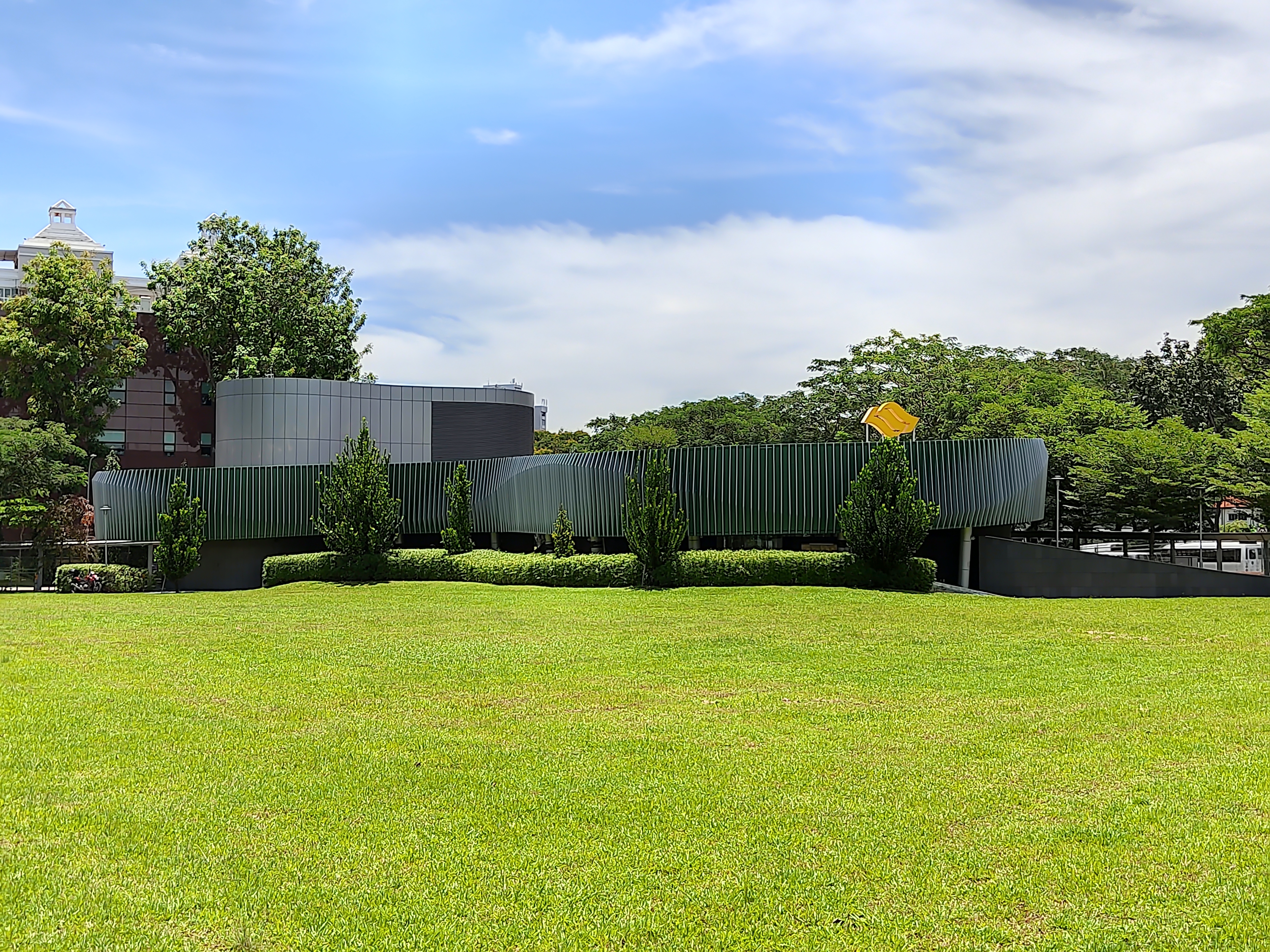
Exit C of the station designed by SAA Architects

The NSL station is simply designed and functional like many of the initial MRT stations. The station has two underground levels – the concourse and platform levels – with an island platform arrangement that allows sharing of a common platform for passengers going in either direction. To give the station a distinct character, Newton station adopts the colour scheme of saffron. The NSL station has a length of 180 metres (590 ft) with a depth of 15 metres (49 ft).

Newton NSL station is one of the first nine underground MRT stations to be designated as a Civil Defence (CD) shelter. As a CD shelter, the station has to be structurally reinforced against bomb attacks with layers of earth-backed, air-backed and airtight walls and slabs. The two entrances of the NSL station are designed to accommodate huge crowds entering the station and are equipped with steel sliding walls and blast locks. It has two diesel generators that provide electricity to the station when the electrical supply to the station fails, and a fully protected 300-cubic-metre (11,000 cu ft) water tank to supply the station when water supply is disrupted.

Designed by SAA Architects, the round entrance serving the DTL station features a curved roof that contrasts against the flyover near the station. The roof is cladded with aluminum bands that creates "undulating curve lines" relating to the ground surface. The combined effect of the light reflecting from the roof and the bands' shadows makes the station appear "alive" during the day, while the station becomes a "beacon" at night that brings commuters towards the station. Intended to be a landmark that brings greenery to the urban landscape, it gives the locality an "energetic visual effect".

=== Artwork ===
The DTL station features "Newton" by Tan Zi Xi (alias Messymsxi) as part of the network's Art-in-Transit programme. (Note: Public art showcase which integrates artworks into the MRT network) Drawing inspiration from Singapore's and Newton's heritage, the artwork presents a speculative landscape of Singapore in 2200 drawn in black and white. Above ground, new buildings were constructed atop the preserved older buildings, as Singapore conserves its heritage while develops more spaces and amenities. The underwater landscape, which uses more organic architectural forms taking the appearance of coral reefs, is meant to be an "oasis" that contrasts against the dirty, crowded environment above ground.

According to the artist, the artwork visualises what Singapore could be in an alternate reality or parallel universe as Singapore evolves and develops upwards and downwards. Through the city's creativity and resourcefulness, the artwork explores how Singapore would utilise its limited space and resources and the fate of its past architecture and heritage.

== Notes and references ==
=== Bibliography ===
- Information portfolio. Singapore: Mass Rapid Transit Corporation. 1984.
- Mass Rapid Transit System : Proceedings of the Singapore Mass Rapid Transit Conference. Singapore: Mass Rapid Transit Corporation. 1987. ISBN 9971-84-636-5. OCLC 82363485.
