= Lee Kong Chian School of Medicine =

Medical school of Nanyang Technological University, Singapore

- Type: Medical school
- Established: 29 October 2010; 16 years ago
- Parent institution: Nanyang Technological University
- Affiliations: Imperial College London (joint MBBS until 2028); National Healthcare Group
- Dean: Joseph Sung
- Location: 11 Mandalay Road, Singapore 308232 (Novena campus), Singapore; 1.3218557°N 103.8485415°E
- Website: www.ntu.edu.sg/medicine

The Lee Kong Chian School of Medicine (LKCMedicine) is the medical school of Nanyang Technological University (NTU) in Singapore. It was established in 2010 as a collaboration between NTU and Imperial College London, and is Singapore's third medical school, after the Yong Loo Lin School of Medicine and Duke–NUS Medical School. The school is named after the businessman and philanthropist Lee Kong Chian, founder of the Lee Foundation. It admitted its first students in 2013 and offers a five-year Bachelor of Medicine, Bachelor of Surgery (MBBS) programme, which was awarded jointly by NTU and Imperial until NTU began conferring the degree on its own. Its primary clinical partner is the National Healthcare Group.

== History ==
=== Founding ===
Prime Minister Lee Hsien Loong announced the establishment of a new medical school at NTU at his National Day Rally on 29 August 2010, and NTU and Imperial College London signed the collaboration agreement on 29 October 2010. On 4 January 2011 NTU announced a S$150 million gift from the Lee Foundation, half of it for student financial aid and half for an endowment for medical education and clinical research. With government matching, the gift brought the total to S$400 million, and the school was named after the foundation's founder.

The school admitted its first cohort of 54 students in August 2013. Its curriculum was developed with Imperial and makes use of team-based learning, a flipped-classroom model, simulation and digital technology. Deputy Prime Minister Teo Chee Hean officially opened the school on 28 August 2017. The first 52 graduates began working in Singapore's hospitals in May 2018.

=== Transition to an NTU degree ===
On 11 April 2022 NTU and Imperial announced that their collaboration agreement for the school would conclude as planned in 2028. Students who enrolled in 2022 or 2023 and complete their MBBS by 2028 receive the joint degree, while those who enrolled from 2024 onwards receive an NTU degree, with the first such graduates in 2029. The new NTU MBBS curriculum, which began in academic year 2024/25, added learning outcomes in digital health, precision medicine, occupational health and health equity, introduced cadaveric dissection for anatomy in Years 3 and 4, and integrates the medical humanities across all five years.

The school marked its 15th anniversary in November 2025. By then it had graduated more than 800 doctors, and its 2025 intake of 190 students was its largest.

=== Deans ===
Dean	Tenure
Steve Smith	Founding dean
Dermot Kelleher	c. 2012–2014
James Best	2014–2021
Joseph Sung	2021–present

Joseph Sung, a gastroenterologist and former vice-chancellor of the Chinese University of Hong Kong, was announced as dean in August 2020 and was concurrently appointed NTU's Senior Vice President (Health and Life Sciences).

== Campuses ==
The school operates on two campuses. On 8 January 2015 the then President of Singapore, Tony Tan, laid the foundation stones for its two purpose-built buildings.

=== Novena campus ===
The 20-storey Clinical Sciences Building at 11 Mandalay Road, in the HealthCity Novena medical district next to Tan Tock Seng Hospital, was unveiled on 2 March 2017.

=== Yunnan Garden campus ===
The seven-storey Experimental Medicine Building stands on NTU's main campus in Yunnan Garden.

== Rankings ==
In the QS World University Rankings by Subject published in March 2021, NTU was placed joint 89th for Medicine, making LKCMedicine the youngest medical school in the global top 100 for the subject. In the Times Higher Education World University Rankings 2025, it was ranked 85th in the Medical and Health subject category.
