= NHG Health =

Singapore group of healthcare institutions

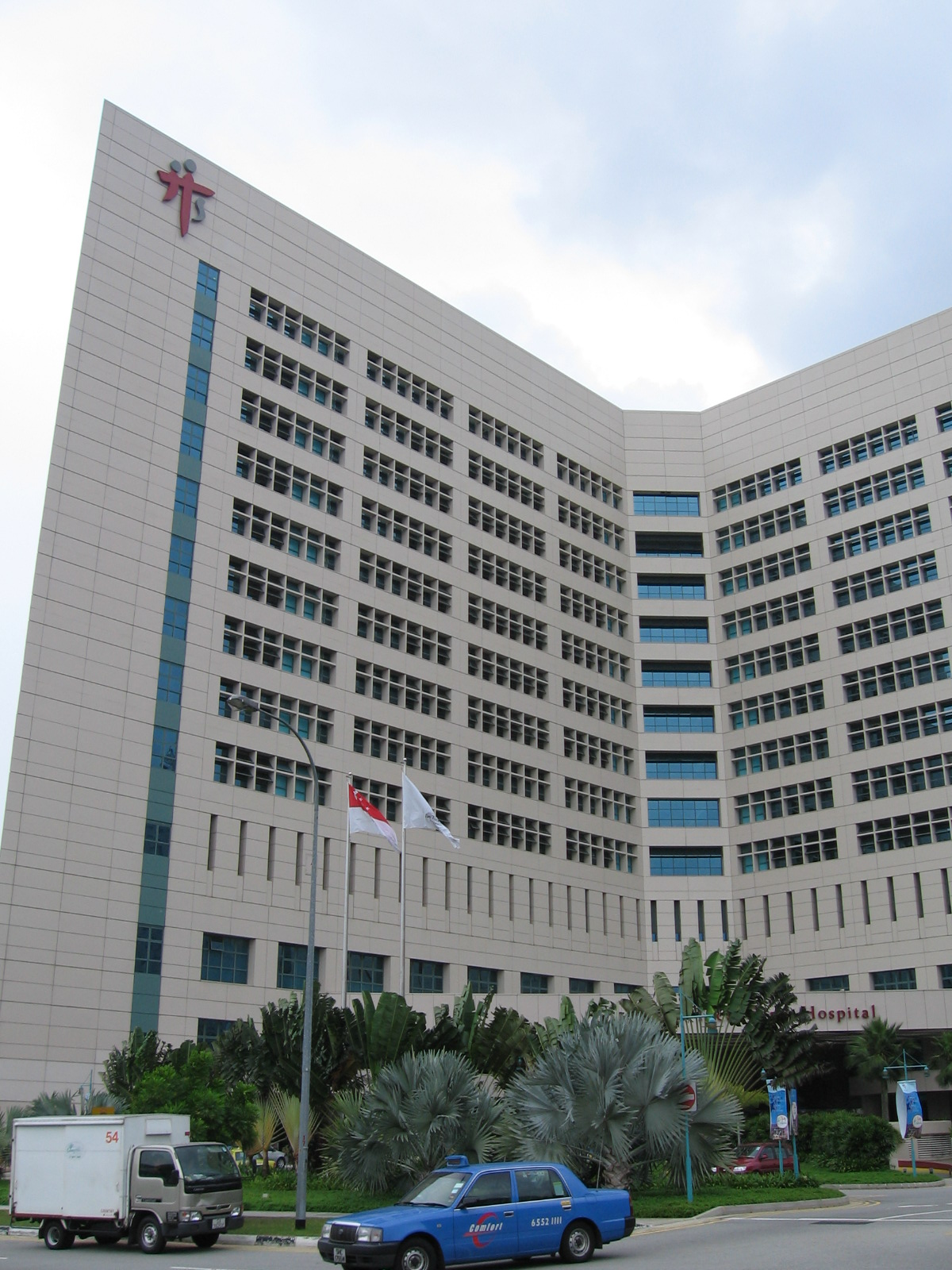
- Tan Tock Seng Hospital, the oldest and largest hospital in the NHG
- Formation: 15 March 2000; 26 years ago
- Registration no.: 200002150H
- Owner: Ministry of Health
- Chairman: Tan Tee How
- Group CEO: Professor Joe Sim
- Parent organization: MOH Holdings Pte. Ltd.
- Website: nhghealth.com.sg

NHG Health, formerly known as National Healthcare Group, is a group of healthcare institutions located in Singapore. Established in 2000, the group consists of three public hospitals, one community hospital, and a network of 10 polyclinics. Tan Tock Seng Hospital is the largest hospital in the group and serves as the flagship hospital for the group. As the Regional Health Manager for 1.5 million residents in Central and North Singapore, NHG Health collaborates with private general practices, public and community health and social care providers to keep residents well and healthy.

== History ==
In November 1999, Minister for Health Lim Hng Kiang announced that Singapore's public healthcare institutions would be reorganized into two delivery networks, or clusters. In October 2000, the formation of the two clusters - National Healthcare Group and SingHealth - was officially completed. National Healthcare Group reports that it offers accessible, continuous, economical, and wide-ranging health care service. The stated core values of the National health care group are that it's "people-centric, ethical, responsible, and has empathy toward the community and its members".

On 1 July 2025, the group was renamed as NHG Health.

== Organization ==
=== Healthcare institutions ===
==== Tan Tock Seng Hospital ====
Tan Tock Seng Hospital (TTSH) is a tertiary referral hospital in Singapore, located in Novena. It has 45 clinical and allied health departments, 16 specialist centres and is powered by more than 8,000 healthcare staff. TTSH is Singapore's second-largest acute care general hospital with over 1,500 beds (second only to Singapore General Hospital). TTSH has the busiest trauma centre in the country; 100 trauma cases are seen every day and 100 surgeries are performed daily.

TTSH is the flagship hospital of the NHG Health and the principal teaching hospital for the NTU Lee Kong Chian School of Medicine. Its campus includes the National Centre for Infectious Diseases (NCID) and two national specialty centres, namely the National Skin Centre (NSC) and the National Neuroscience Institute (NNI).

==== Khoo Teck Puat Hospital & Yishun Community Hospital ====
Khoo Teck Puat Hospital (KTPH) is a 795-bed general hospital in Yishun that was opened in 2010, while the Yishun Community Hospital (YCH) is a 200-bed community hospital that was opened in 2015. Both hospitals are grouped together as a regional health campus called Yishun Health Campus.

==== Institute of Mental Health ====
Founded in 1928, the Institute of Mental Health (IMH) is a 2000-bed hospital located at the 23-hectare campus of Buangkok Green Medical Park in the northeast of Singapore. IMH offers a multidisciplinary and comprehensive range of psychiatric, rehabilitative and counselling services in both hospital and community-based settings to meet the needs of three groups of people – children and adolescents, adults, and the elderly. Besides providing patient-centred clinical services, IMH trains the current and next generation of clinicians, nurses and allied health professionals in psychiatry and conducts research related to mental health.

==== NHG Polyclinics ====
NHG Polyclinics is the primary healthcare arm of the NHG Health. It has 10 polyclinics in the central and northern parts of Singapore. They provide treatment for acute medical conditions, management of chronic diseases, women and child health services and dental care, health promotion, early and accurate diagnosis, and disease management through physician led team-based care as well as enhancing the capability of Family Medicine through research and teaching.

==== National Skin Centre ====
The National Skin Centre (NSC) is an outpatient specialist dermatology centre located next to Tan Tock Seng Hospital as part of the Healthcity Novena complex. It handles a patient load of about 1,000 patients daily. Incorporated on 9 June 1988, it started operations on 1 November 1988 after taking over the treatment of skin diseases from Middle Road Hospital. It provides specialised dermatological services, trains medical students and postgraduates, and undertakes research in dermatology. The center also conducts continuing medical education for doctors and paramedical personnel.

==== Woodlands Hospital ====
The integrated acute and community hospital with a capacity for 1,000 beds, offers the full range of healthcare services encompassing acute, sub-acute, rehabilitative and transitional care. Along with other specialist services at the Medical Centre, it also operates the Women’s Health & Specialist Centre and Children’s Clinic. The Campus includes almost 400 beds in its long-term care facilities and is fully integrated with the 1.5-ha Woodlands Healing Garden.

=== Other institutions ===
Apart from the provision of healthcare through healthcare institutions, NHG Health also operates several other divisions in other areas such as education and ancillary health services.

==== NHG College ====
NHG College was established on 19 July 2002 to educate, train and raise the professionalism of NHG Health staff. It is structured into four institutes, namely the Institute of Healthcare Leadership, Institute of Clinical Education, Institute of Healthcare Quality and the Institute of Professional Training.

==== NHG Diagnostics ====
NHG Diagnostics is a clinical shared service of the NHG Health's Population Health Campus. NHG Diagnostics was founded in 2000. It provides one-stop laboratory and radiography services in primary care, supporting polyclinics, general practitioners, community hospitals, nursing homes, home care providers, and the community via its extensive network in Singapore. Services are offered at both static and mobile centres, including general X-ray, mammography, ultrasound, bone mineral densitometry, and home phlebotomy. Additionally, it provides teleradiology reporting and professional services in managing radiology and laboratory clinics.

==== NHG Pharmacy ====
NHG Pharmacy manages the pharmacy and retail pharmacies at the 10 polyclinics and in retail centres, and also provides medication management services to intermediate and long term care facilities. The pharmacies also provide smoking cessation clinics, anti-coagulation clinics, and hypertension-diabetes-lipidaemia clinics led by pharmacists to control chronic diseases. NHG Pharmacy also allows patients to refill their prescriptions online, and choose to have their uncollected medicines delivered to them, or collected from a designated polyclinic.

==== Primary Care Academy ====
Established in April 2007, the Primary Care Academy provides training and skills upgrading for primary care doctors, nurses, allied health professionals and ancillary staff.

== See also ==
- National University Health System
- SingHealth
