= Tan Tock Seng Hospital =

Hospital in Singapore

Tan Tock Seng Hospital 陈笃生医院 (Chinese) Hospital Tan Tock Seng (Malay) தன் டாக் செங் மருத்துவமனை (Tamil)
- NHG Health

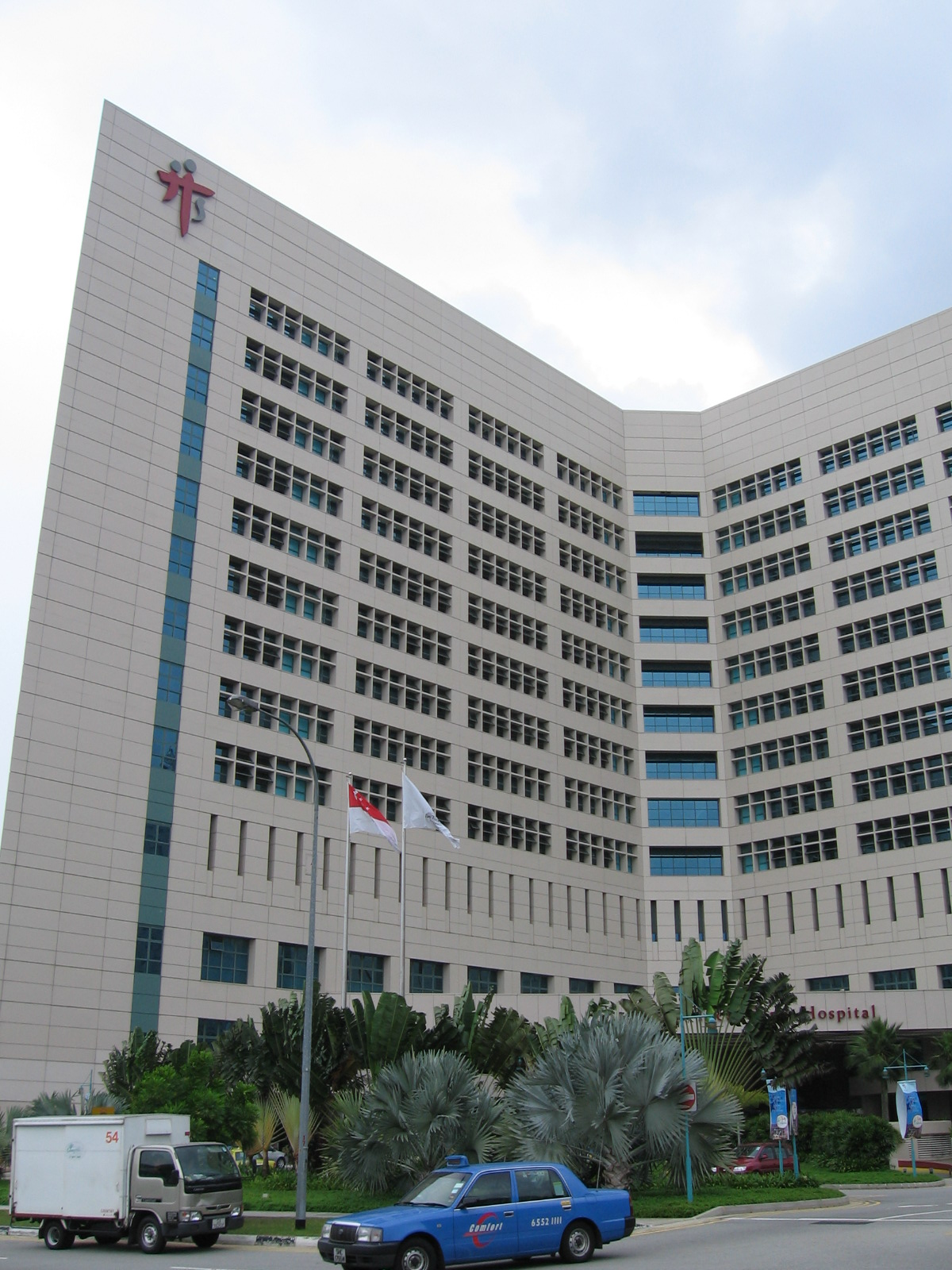
- The main hospital building at Jalan Tan Tock Seng

Geography
- Location: 11 Jalan Tan Tock Seng, Singapore 308433, Singapore
- Coordinates: 1°19′17.8″N 103°50′45.4″E

Organisation
- Type: Teaching
- Affiliated university: Lee Kong Chian School of Medicine, NTU

Services
- Emergency department: Adult Level I
- Beds: More than 2,000

History
- Founded: 1844

Links
- Website: www.ttsh.com.sg
- Lists: Hospitals in Singapore

Tan Tock Seng Hospital
- Chinese: 陈笃生医院
Transcriptions
Standard Mandarin
- Hanyu Pinyin: Chén Dǔshēng yīyuàn
Yue: Cantonese
- Jyutping: Can4 Duk1 Saang1 Ji1 Jyun6
Southern Min
- Hokkien POJ: Tân Tok-seng I-īⁿ
- Tâi-lô: Tân Tok-sing I-īnn

Tan Tock Seng Hospital (TTSH) is a public general hospital in Novena, Singapore, and an anchor hospital of NHG Health. It operates more than 2,000 beds, has a staff of over 11,000 and provides care in more than 60 clinical disciplines. Founded in 1844 with a donation from the merchant Tan Tock Seng, it is one of Singapore's oldest hospitals. Its campus, part of the 17-hectare HealthCity Novena development, also houses the 330-bed National Centre for Infectious Diseases, the National Skin Centre and the Clinical Sciences Building of NTU's Lee Kong Chian School of Medicine.

== History ==
=== Pearl's Hill and Balestier (1844–1909) ===
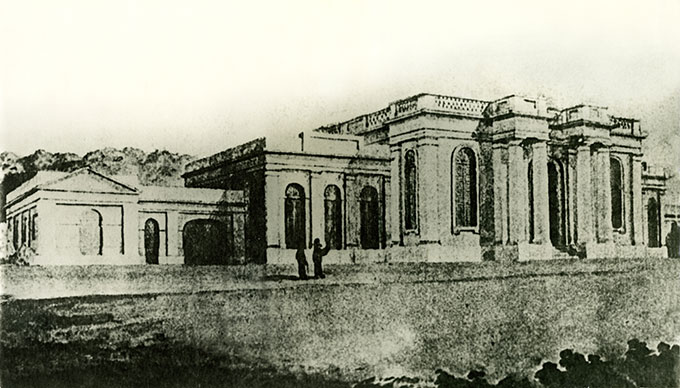
The hospital at Pearl's Hill

Tan Tock Seng offered $5,000 to build a hospital for the poor, and in 1844 the foundation stone was laid on Pearl's Hill; its brass plate named the institution the "Chinese Pauper Hospital". Designed by John Turnbull Thomson, it was the first hospital in Singapore built entirely from non-government funds. Patients were at first housed in an attap shed at the foot of the hill and moved into the building only in 1849, after a storm destroyed the shed.

When the government decided in 1856 to fortify Pearl's Hill, a new site was chosen at the junction of Serangoon Road and Balestier Road, and patients moved there in June 1861. Tan Tock Seng's widow, Lee Seo Neo, funded a female ward. In 1904 the hospital's planned new site was changed to land between Moulmein Road and Balestier Road, bought with a $50,000 donation from Loke Yew. The new hospital, built by the Public Works Department with nearly 1,000 beds, was completed in 1909. Its pavilion wards, built between 1907 and 1931, are still used for patient care.

=== 20th century ===
During the Japanese occupation of Singapore the hospital was renamed Hakuai Byoin ("Universal Love Hospital") and served as a main civilian hospital. In 1948 it was designated a centre for tuberculosis treatment, and in 1961 it was taken over fully by the government. The hospital performed Singapore's first open-heart surgery in 1967, its first coronary bypass surgery in 1976 and its first bone marrow transplant in 1985.

Construction of a S$580 million hospital building at Jalan Tan Tock Seng began in 1993 and was completed in 1998. The new hospital was officially opened by Deputy Prime Minister Lee Hsien Loong on 1 April 2000.

=== 21st century ===
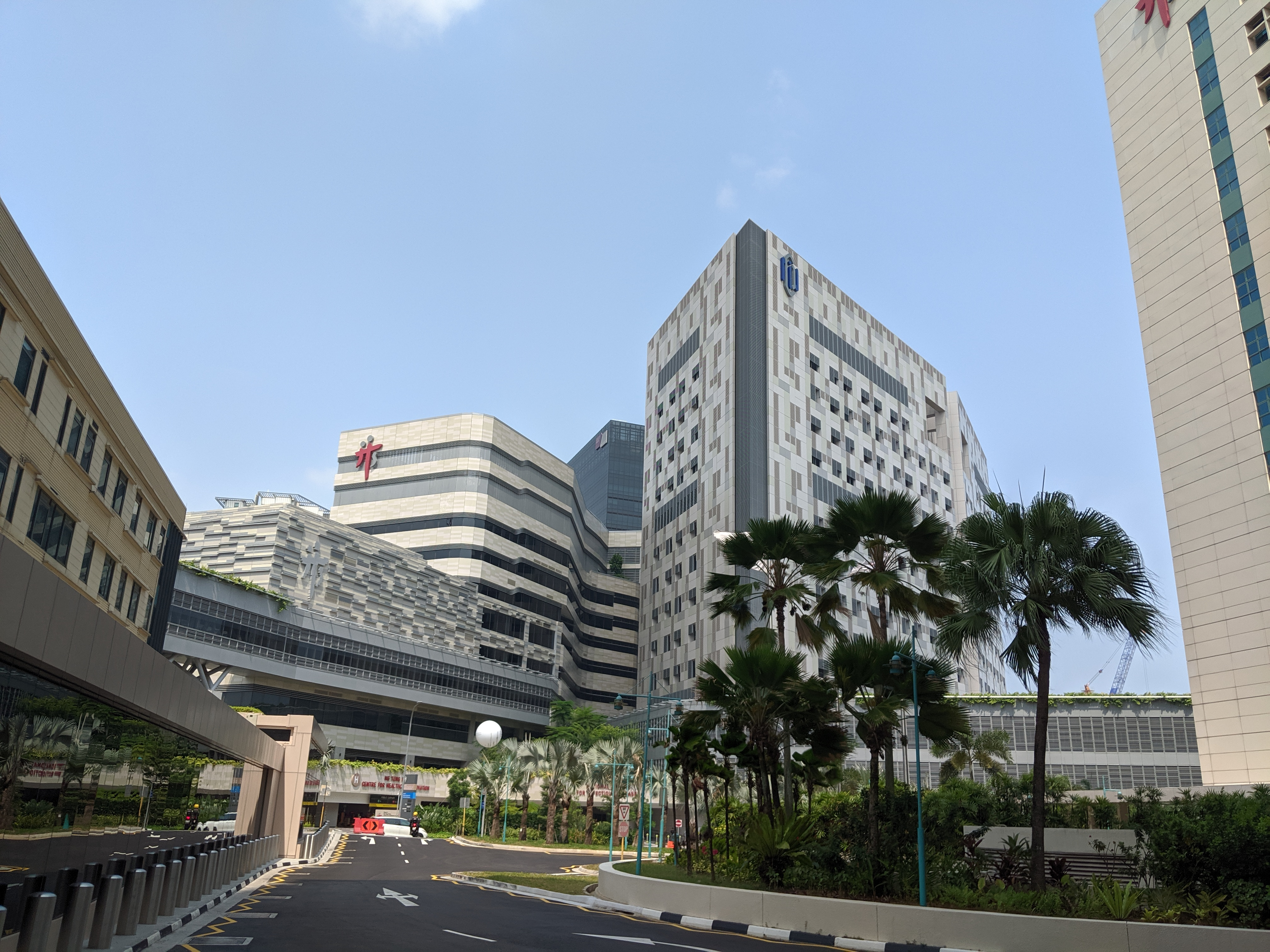
The National Centre for Infectious Diseases and the Ng Teng Fong Centre for Healthcare Innovation, 2019

During the 2003 SARS outbreak TTSH was the designated hospital for SARS, and the treatment of suspected and confirmed cases was centralised there and at the neighbouring Communicable Disease Centre.

The HealthCity Novena master plan, a 17-hectare integrated healthcare campus centred on the hospital, was launched in 2013 by the Minister for Health, Gan Kim Yong. Its first phase, carried out from 2017 to 2024, produced the Lee Kong Chian School of Medicine Clinical Sciences Building (2017), the Ng Teng Fong Centre for Healthcare Innovation and the National Centre for Infectious Diseases (2019), a new building for the National Skin Centre (2023) and the TTSH Integrated Care Hub (2024). The Communicable Disease Centre ceased operations on 13 December 2018, and the 330-bed National Centre for Infectious Diseases, which took over its work, was officially opened on 7 September 2019. The Integrated Care Hub, which brings together acute, rehabilitation, recovery and palliative care and also houses Dover Park Hospice and the TTSH Rehabilitation Centre, was officially opened by the Minister for Health, Ong Ye Kung, on 19 March 2024.

The second phase of the master plan was unveiled on 9 September 2025. It centres on a TTSH Medical Tower with about 600 acute beds and an enlarged emergency department, to be built on the site of five six-storey blocks from the 1950s that had served as general wards and, from 2003, as a SARS wing; its completion is expected after 2030.

== Services ==
The hospital's emergency department has handled more than 125,000 cases a year; in 2024 about 40 per cent of its patients were aged 65 or older. Its specialist centres include the NHG Heart Centre, NHG Cancer Institute, NHG Eye Institute, the Institute of Geriatrics and Active Ageing and the Institute of Rehabilitation Excellence. The National Neuroscience Institute also operates a campus at TTSH.
