= 2014 in Singapore =

- Decades: 1990s; 2000s; 2010s; 2020s
- See also: Other events of 2014; Timeline of Singaporean history

The following lists events that happened during 2014 in the Republic of Singapore.

== Incumbents ==
- President: Tony Tan Keng Yam
- Prime Minister: Lee Hsien Loong

== Events ==
=== January ===
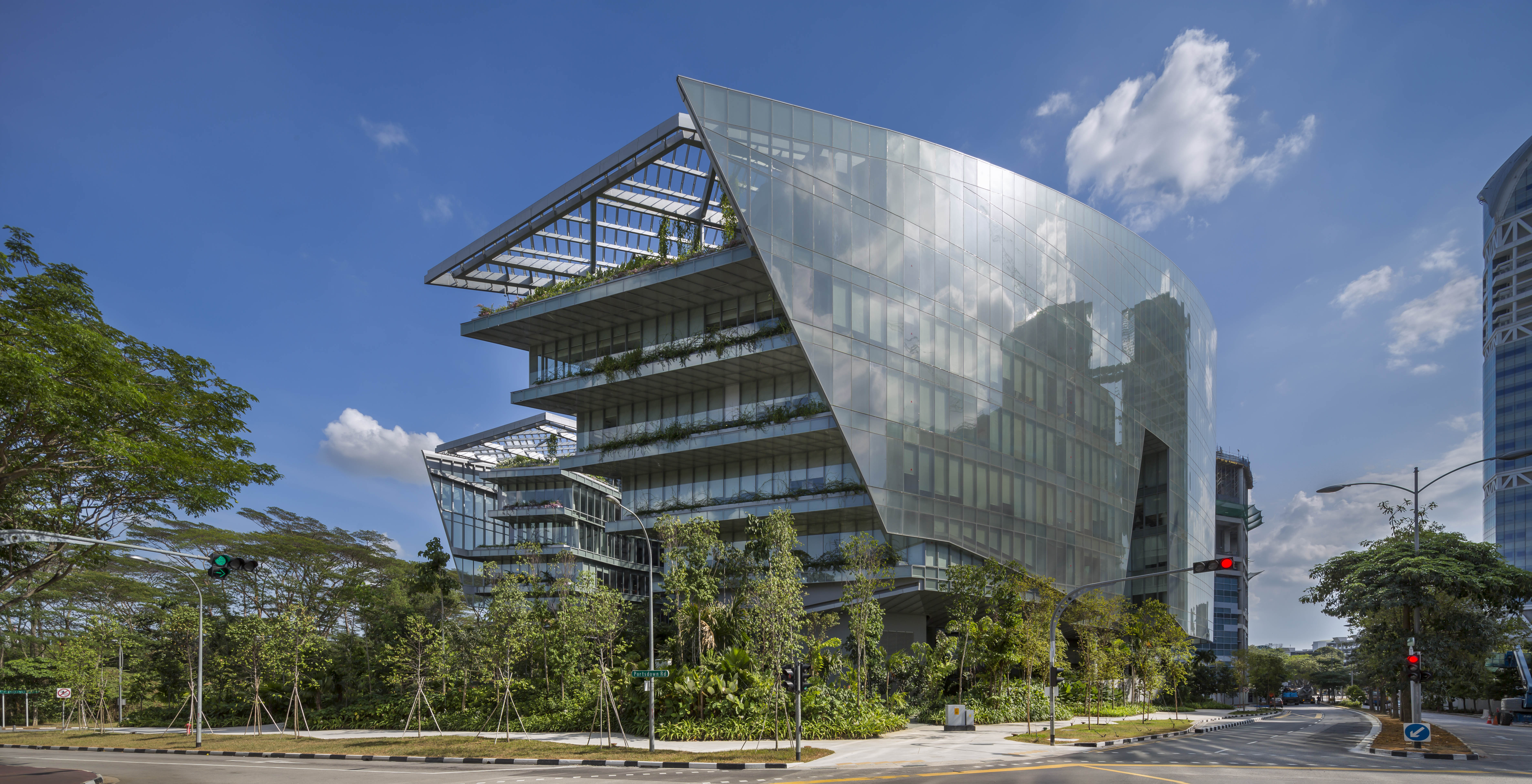
The Sandcrawler

- 4 January – The first Ultimate Fighting Championship fight between mixed martial artists Tarec Saffiedine and Lim Hyun–Gyu was held at Marina Bay Sands.
- 8 January – The expanded section of the ExxonMobil Chemical Plant is officially opened.
- 9 January – Two men were arrested over the kidnapping of a 79-year-old woman Ng Lye Poh, known as the mother of Sheng Siong's CEO Lim Hock Chee the prior day. A ransom of S$2 million was recovered at the Seletar West Camp, and Ng was unharmed.
- 11 January – North–South MRT line was partially disrupted for one and a half hours between Kranji and Yew Tee station.
- 15 January – Infinite Studios is officially opened in one-north, housing media companies.
- 16 January –
  - The Sandcrawler is officially opened as Lucasfilm's Singapore studio.
  - Public Transport Council approved a fare increase of 3.2% on train and bus fares to be started on 6 April. This is in consideration of the 2012 and 2013 fare increase cap of 4.5 per cent and 2.1 per cent, respectively, which was not implemented. The remaining 3.4 per cent will be rolled over to the 2014 exercise.
- 20 January – A driver was arrested for trespassing the Ministry of Foreign Affairs headquarters and driving through checkpoint without clearance in a manhunt lasting three days.

=== February ===
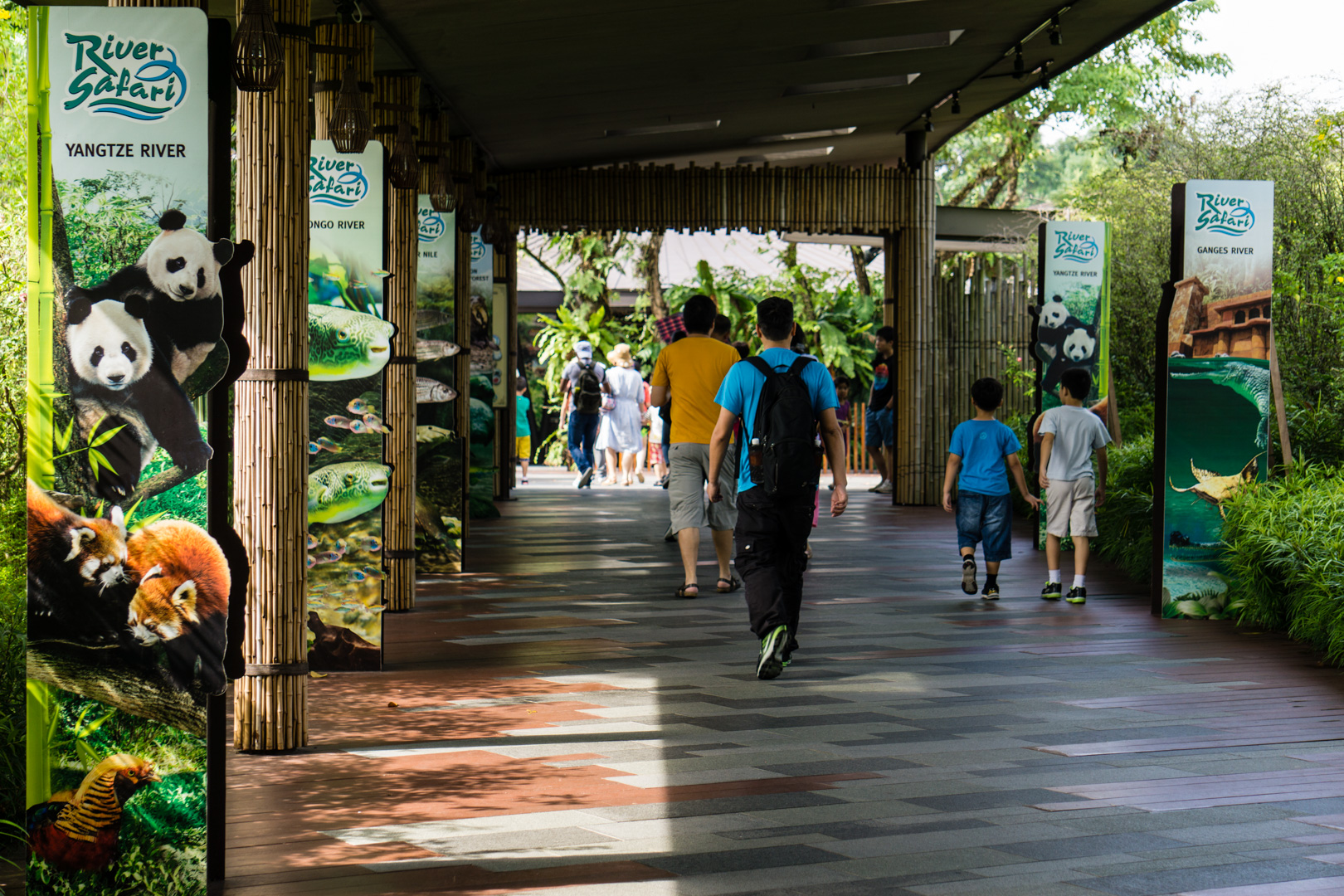
River Safari

- 5 February – The naming of an Indonesian naval ship as "KRI Usman Harun" caused a controversy as it could reopen wounds from Confrontation.
- 7 February – The National Family Council is renamed Families for Life with a new logo launched.
- 16 February – MinLaw announced that seven golf courses will be offered lease extensions ranging from 2030 to 2040, with one of Singapore Island Country Club's golf courses reallocated to the National Trades Union Congress as a public course. Keppel Club and Marina Bay Golf Course will be acquired for redevelopments, with parts of the Tanah Merah Country Club and National Service Resort and Country Club (Changi) acquired for the expansion of Changi Airport. An alternative site is offered to Keppel Club as part of discussions.
- 18 February – The "Usman Harun" will not be allowed in Singapore's naval bases nor take part in joint exercises. In addition, a related statement highlighted the importance of sovereignty.
- 21 February – The Pioneer Generation Package is unveiled to honour Pioneers who helped in the development of Singapore.
- 25 February – Singapore's first LNG terminal opened in Jurong Island, with another to be built in eastern Singapore soon.
- 28 February – The River Safari is officially opened.

=== March ===
- 7 March – The Subordinate Courts is renamed to the State Courts.
- 8 March – Another security breach takes place at the checkpoints when a driver crashed a security barrier, marking the first time it failed. The driver was caught after a five hour search.
- 12 March –
  - The Ministry of the Environment and Water Resources announces that the Pollutant Standards Index (PSI) will be refined to include PM2.5 readings from May. The new PSI is brought forward to 1 April in light of expected hazy conditions.
  - The National Design Centre is officially opened.
- 13 March – The Protection from Harassment Act is passed. The law overhauls the definition of harassment, giving more protection to victims as well as strengthen penalties against stalking.
- 14 March – The Singapore Women's Hall of Fame is launched by the Singapore Council of Women's Organisations.
- 16 March – The McDonald's outlet at King Albert Park building closes. The building has since been demolished for a new residential and commercial development.
- 17 March – The Fast And Secure Transfers (FAST) system is launched, ensuring instant fund transfers.
- 21 March – Several shops in Jem are hit by an 11-hour power failure from 7am to 6pm.
- 28 March – The Singapore Institute of Technology, a university that was first established in 2009, becomes Singapore's 5th autonomous university.
- 29 March – P&G opens its R&D centre in Biopolis.

=== April ===
- 1 April –
  - New controls for prepaid SIM cards take effect to combat the use for criminal activities. The maximum number of prepaid SIM cards per holder is reduced from 10 to three, although people with more than three cards previously can keep them. In addition, passports can be used for registration along with NRICs currently.
  - Singapore Sports Council is rebranded to Sport Singapore.
- 7 April – Singapore and Malaysia announced that they are to develop a "Friendship Bridge" to improve road connectivity between Island and Mainland that will strengthen and enhance the relationship between both countries.
- 22 April – The National University Hospital opens a new medical centre block to better serve patients.
- 23 April – Orchard Gateway, a mixed-use mall, opens to the public.

=== May ===
- 1 May – The Devan Nair Institute for Employment and Employability officially opens in Jurong.
- 4 May – After a seven-year run, the Songs of the Sea show holds its last performance in Sentosa.
- 12 May – OCBC Bank launches the OCBC Pay Anyone app as a way to transfer money through numbers.
- 25 May – Singaporeans First is officially launched.
- 26 May – Sentosa Development Corporation launches a new tagline "The State of Fun" to replace "Asia's Favourite Playground".
- 28 May
  - Construction works have started on the new State Courts Towers, which will allow the State Courts to deal with more cases, with completion by 2020.
  - A consortium comprising Kawasaki Heavy Industries and CSR Qingdao Sifang is awarded a contract for trains on the Thomson MRT line and Eastern Region MRT line. The lines will eventually be run as a single route.
- 29 May –
  - DBS Bank launches the DBS Paylah! app.
  - Roy Ngerng is sued by PM Lee Hsien Loong over a Central Provident Fund posting that led to him being fired from Tan Tock Seng Hospital. On 7 November 2014, the court found that there is indeed defamation. He is thus ordered to pay $150,000 in damages on 17 December 2015.

=== June ===
- June —
  - All sport programmes officially return moved from Channel 5 to Okto, and all culture, lifestyle, leisure, fashion show, arts, documentaries, and classical music officially return moved from Okto to Channel 5.
  - Channel 5 continue officially became all full 100% Singaporean Standard English (or Singapore English), and Singaporean Colloquial English (or Singlish) very first national locally variety entertainment, music, light entertainment, and entertainment free-to-air terrestrial television channel programming line-up all of music entertainment television programmes from the United States, Singapore, the United Kingdom, Australia and New Zealand to appeal to Standard Singaporean English-speaking locals showcasing sitcom, comedy, reality show, game show, talent show, variety show, entertainment, light entertainment, music video, Hollywood movie bioscope, nightlife, nightclub, red carpet, culture, lifestyle, leisure, fashion show, arts, documentaries, classical music, and one main flagship nightly evening television news programme edition only (as News 5 Tonight).
  - The Kallang Wave Mall is opened, operated by SMRT and FairPrice.
- 4 June – SingTel and Standard Chartered launch the Dash app, a mobile wallet.
- 21 June – The new National Stadium, Singapore at the Singapore Sports Hub opened its doors.
- 27 June – The Thomson East–Coast Line starts construction. At the same time, the Land Transport Authority announced that Canberra MRT station will be built, to be completed by 2019. The full details of Canberra station are unveiled on 1 August.
- 29 June – The West section of the Punggol LRT line is officially opened.
- 30 June – The Public Utilities Board announced the Murnane Pipeline to meet future water demand in the city area. Part of the pipeline will go under the Rail Corridor, which will be completed by 2019.

=== July ===
- 2 July – The Monetary Authority of Singapore (MAS) announces that S$10,000 notes will no longer be issued from 1 October to fight money laundering. In addition, penalties will be tightened for financial breaches with a review expected soon.
- 8 July – A controversy erupts after the National Library Board removes two books for "not promoting family values". The books were initially planned to be destroyed. After a backlash and a revelation of more books removed, the books are reinstated on 18 July, albeit in the adult section.
- 16 July –
  - Malaysia announced that it will charge the Vehicle Entry Permit (VEP) for all Singapore registration vehicles entering mainland Johor.
  - Sentosa's new show called Wings of Time officially opens, replacing the now-shut Songs of the Sea. The show has been running since 16 July.

=== August ===
- 1 August – River Safari Cruise opens at River Safari, replacing a defunct boat ride at Singapore Zoo. The ride traverses the Upper Seletar Reservoir.
- 5 August – The Transboundary Haze Pollution Act is passed to deal with companies that causes haze pollution in Singapore, impose statutory duties on entities not to engage in such conduct and sets out a compensation regime. However, the penalties have been set at a maximum of $2 million as this is a new law with reviews of the limits in future. No limits are set for civil cases.
- 9 August – Hossan Leong hosts Singapore's 49th National Day Parade at the Marina Bay Floating Platform. Also, Leong hosted the NDP 6 years later in 2020 for the evening show together with Joakim Gomez, Rebecca Lim, and Fauzi Laily. This was the last National Day Parade appearance for former (and first) Prime Minister of Singapore Lee Kuan Yew before his death on 23 March the following year, who was the only Member of Parliament to have appeared on every parade since independence.
- 14 August – The Murai Urban Live Firing Facility is officially opened, allowing soldiers to train urban warfare skills in a safe area.
- 15 August – Land Transport Authority announced the merger of the Thomson Line (TSL) and the Eastern Region Line (ERL), which became Thomson–East Coast MRT line. The eastern section will be 13 km (8.1 miles) long with nine stations, to be completed in two stages in 2023 and 2024. A 2.2 km (1.4 miles) extension of the Downtown MRT line to Sungei Bedok MRT station was also unveiled with two stations by 2024, creating an interchange with the Thomson–East Coast line, as well as the East Coast Integrated Depot, the world's first four-in-one depot supporting three MRT lines and a bus depot.
- 17 August – Plans are unveiled for the Jurong area, with a revamp of the Jurong Lake Gardens, more housing, the moving of Science Centre to Lakeside, among others. The Ayer Rajah Expressway may also be realigned to support more lakeside housing.
- 19 August – A security intrusion took place at the Raffles Marina in relation to a custody case.
- 21 August – A 9-hour train disruption occurred on the North East MRT line, which was caused by dislodged arms, creating a power fault.
- 25 August –
  - The Ministry of Education's committee ASPIRE announced recommendations to help improve education and career choices for Institute of Technical Education (ITE) and Polytechnic students. Some recommendations include starting a new education and career guidance (ECG) framework with dedicated career officers in schools and a one-stop portal, a new work and study programme from 2016, a national training scheme for Poly and ITE graduates, more structured internships and Higher NITEC places, and posting national servicemen to vocations that match their skills learnt in school. All ten recommendations are accepted by MOE.
  - The Land Transport Authority announced that Tanah Merah MRT station will have an additional platform by 2024 to shorten waiting times for commuters heading to Expo and Changi Airport.
- 27 August –
  - Official opening of the Agrobazzar Malaysia outlet at Sultan Gate by the Prime Minister, Lee Hsien Loong and his Malaysian counterpart Najib Tun Razak.
  - Dulwich College (Singapore) opened its campus at Bukit Batok with an initial cohort size of 884 students with some support from Economic Development Board.
- 29 August – Changi General Hospital's new medical centre starts construction, slated for completion by 2017. At the same time, plans for two polyclinics in Pioneer and Punggol were announced, which will be completed by 2017 as well. Four more polyclinics are also expected by 2020 with redevelopments for polyclinics in Ang Mo Kio and Bedok.

=== September ===
- 1 September – MediaCorp Channel 8's morning belt (only weekdays) is revamped with the introduction of Morning Express, replacing Good Morning Singapore, which had been on air since March 1995.
- 2 September – The Jurong Rock Caverns officially opens, making it Southeast Asia's first commercial underground rock cavern storage facility for liquid hydrocarbons.
- 10 September – The Media Development Authority classifies the film "To Singapore, with Love" as "Not Allowed for All Ratings" (NAR) due to themes that undermine national security. An appeal against the ban is rejected two months later.
- 15 September – The first automated pharmacy opens in Tan Tock Seng Hospital.
- 16 September – K Box announced that a data breach hit their servers, resulting in a leak of 300,000 clients' data.
- 17 September –
  - Former tour guide Yang Yin was arrested in a case involving criminal breach of trust over the Lasting Power of Attorney. He was charged a month later.
  - The Lifelong Learning Institute opens in Paya Lebar. In addition, a new CET 2020 Masterplan is launched with a SkillsFuture Council to be set up soon.
- 25 September – The National Heart Centre Singapore's new building opens to better serve heart patients.
- 27 September – Heckling took place after several protesters at Hong Lim Park went over to a performance by several special needs children.
- 28 September – A new road network in Marina South opens as a result of the Marina Coastal Expressway.

=== October ===
- 1 October –
  - The Municipal Services Office, first announced during the National Day Rally, is launched. It aims to provide public services more effectively.
  - The Family Justice Courts have been launched to settle family cases more effectively. This brings together the High Court (Family Division), the Family Court and the Youth Court (previously known as the Juvenile Court).
- 7 October – The Remote Gambling Act is passed to regulate online gambling activities.
- 13 October – SAF Volunteer Corps is established, and sign-ups started from this day.
- 19 October – Twenty-two passengers and crew were injured when an Airbus A380 plane operated by Singapore Airlines (SIA) and traveling from the Changi International Airport to Mumbai, hit sudden turbulence during descent.
- 20 October – MediaCorp Channel 8's primetime belt (only weekdays) received revamp with the introduction of Hello Singapore and a half-hour weekday drama (with the first drama being 118), replacing both Evening News and hour-long weekday drama, respectively.
- 23 October – library@orchard is reopened in Orchard Gateway.
- 26 October – Jetstar Asia takes over Valuair's services. This comes after Indonesia lifted restrictions on foreign low-cost carriers operating in the country.
- 28 October – A moored balloon known as an aerostat will be deployed by early next year. The 55-metre long aerostat will be able to detect threats 200 kilometers away from Singapore, being positioned 600 metres above the ground. The aerostat is officially launched in 2016.
- 30 October – The Permanent Court of Arbitration ruled that Malaysia need not pay development charges for a 2010 land swap.

=== November ===
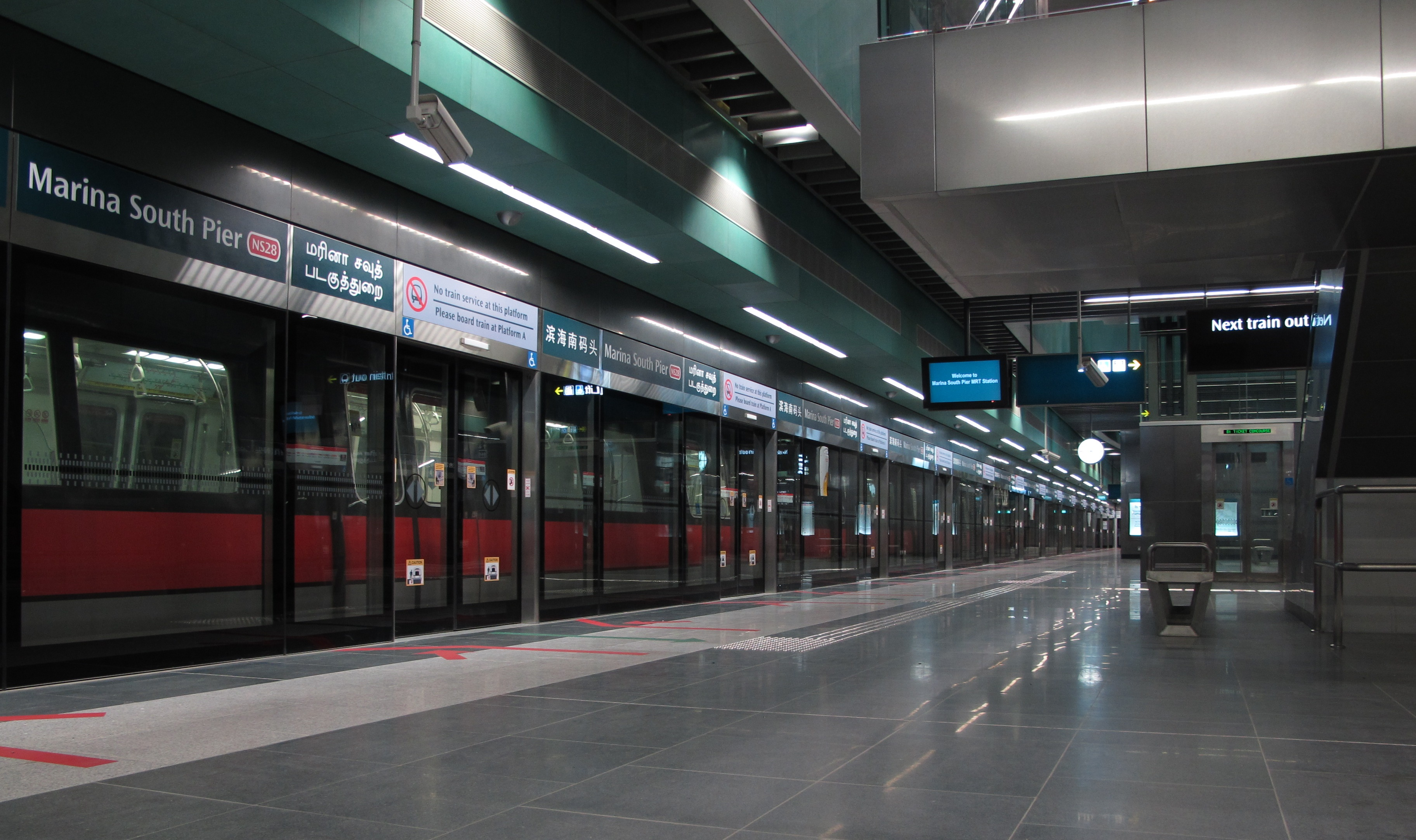
Marina South Pier MRT station

- 2 November – A cheating case took place at Sim Lim Square, where a tourist was overcharged for an iPhone.
- 3 November –
  - The Prevention of Human Trafficking Act is passed in Parliament. It aims to take strong action against human trafficking with stiff penalties for those who engage in it.
  - Construction starts on the future National Centre for Infectious Diseases and Centre for Healthcare Innovation, which will better handle outbreaks and pioneer advances in healthcare respectively.
  - The Metropolis, an office tower in one-north, is officially opened. The building also serves as Ho Bee Land's headquarters.
- 5 November – The Singapore Exchange (SGX) was hit by lightning, causing a 3 hour disruption to trading activities. The Monetary Authority of Singapore (MAS) has since instructed SGX to take action to prevent another recurrence.
- 8 November – The Sustainable Singapore Blueprint 2015 is launched, setting new targets for skyrise greenery, cleanliness, transport, among others.
- 19 November – The first two Bombardier Innovia APM 100 C801A trains are launched on the Bukit Panjang LRT line.
- 23 November – Marina South Pier MRT station opens as part of the North–South MRT line extension.
- 24 November – Smart Nation is launched to spearhead digital initiatives.
- 28 November –
  - Shisha smoking is banned to reduce health risks.
  - The Seletar Mall opens its doors.
- 30 November –
  - Bedok Bus Interchange officially opened as Singapore's seventh air-conditioned bus interchange.
  - OneKM (now known as KINEX) is officially opened.

=== December ===
- 5 December – Construction starts for Jewel Changi Airport, as well as the expansion of Changi Airport Terminal 1 with completion by 2018.
- 8 December – Warehouse Club opens as a membership-only store at FairPrice Hub.
- 23 December – Pacnet will be acquired by Telstra, an Australian telco firm. The acquisition is completed on 16 April 2015.
- 24 December – Changi General Hospital and St. Andrew's Community Hospital opened an Integrated Building which will expand hospital space.
- 27 December – The Big Box, a megastore, opens to the public.
- 28 December – Indonesia AirAsia Flight 8501 crashes while en route to Changi Airport from Surabaya, killing all 162 passengers on board.
- 31 December – MediaCorp Channel 5's primetime belt received revamp (such as moving News 5 (formerly News 5 Tonight) to 9pm) as a part of "Local Upsize" transition.

== Deaths ==
- 14 January – William Tiah Hung Wai, murder victim of Chan Lie Sian (b. 1978).
- 21 January – Kassim Masdor, music composer, arranger and producer of Modern Malay music (b. 1938).
- 30 January – Ong Kim Hoi, founder of No Signboard Seafood (b. 1940).
- 25 February – Mohamed Ariff Suradi, former PAP Member of Parliament for Ulu Pandan Constituency and Kampong Kembangan Constituency (b. 1929).
- 26 February – Chua Sian Chin, former Cabinet Minister and former PAP Member of Parliament for MacPherson Constituency (b. 1933).
- 8 March – Lee Gek Seng, pioneering unionist and founding member of the People's Action Party (b. 1927).
- 19 March – Nancy Gan, murder victim of Dewi Sukowati (b. 1945).
- 13 April – Abdul Ghani Abdul Hamid, writer, poet and artist (b. 1933).
- 23 April – Dixie Tan, former PAP Member of Parliament for Ulu Pandan SMC (b. 1935).
- 30 April – Kartina Dahari, Singaporean Malay singer (b. 1941).
- 11 June – Muhammad Noor, murder victim of Rasheed Muhammad and Ramzan Rizwan (b. 1955).
- 1 August – Mohammad Airyl Amirul Haziq Mohamed Ariff, murder victim of Noraidah Mohd Yussof (b. 2009).
- 5 August – Janet Lim, Singapore's first Asian hospital matron (b. 1923).
- 6 August – Daisy Vaithilingam, co-founders of MINDS (b. 1925).
- 27 August – Juliana Yasin, artist (b. 1970).
- 29 August – David Bala, former comedian and actor (b. 1947).
- 1 November – Iskandar Ismail, Musician and winner of 2008 Cultural Medallion in Music (b. 1956).
- 19 November – Tran Cam Ny, murder victim of Jackson Lim Hou Peng (b. 1982).
- 27 December – Michael Fam, 6th Chairman of the Housing and Development Board (b. 1927).

=== Unknown date ===
- March – Umaisyah, murder victim in the Chin Swee Road child death (b. 2011).
