= Devasahayam David Chelliah =

Singaporean Anglican archdeacon

The Venerable Reverend Dr Devasahayam David Chelliah JP OBE
- Title: Reverend

Personal life
- Born: 14 March 1894 Tirunelveli district, South India, British India
- Died: 2 April 1979 (aged 85) Toa Payoh Hospital, Toa Payoh, Singapore
- Spouse: Rosalind Chelliah (m. 1925; died 1971)
- Children: 6, including Sons': David Ernest Srinivasagam Chelliah and Jonathan Chelliah, Daughters; Iris Ponnu Constance Nallayya, Jazmyn Margurite Elizabeth Chelliah, Noelle George, Leaena Tambyah
- Citizenship: Singaporean
- Education: University of London (PhD)
- Other name: D D Chelliah

Religious life
- Religion: Anglicanism
- Consecration: St Andrew's Cathedral, Singapore

Senior posting
- Based in: Singapore
- Post: Archdeacon of Singapore
- Period in office: 1958–1967
- Predecessor: Robin Woods
- Successor: Lau Teik Oon

The Venerable Reverend Dr Devasahayam David Chelliah (14 March 1894 – 2 April 1979) JP OBE, was the first Asian Archdeacon of Singapore.

== Early life and education ==
Born in the Tirunelveli district, South India on 14 March 1894, he was the fifth of the nine children. Chelliah moved to Penang, Malaya at the age of seventeen to take up a job offer as the Headmaster of an Anglican school. In early 1912 he became a Headmaster of St George's Mission Primary School. In 1915 he became one of the staff of Anglo-Chinese School which was managed by the American Methodist Mission.

Chelliah left for London in September 1922 to study at the University of London and graduated with Honours Degree (External) in 1923. He extended his study leave to attended the London Day Training College and obtained a Post-Graduate Diploma in Teaching in 1924. Following which, he returned to Malaya to marry to his wife.

Chelliah got his PhD from the University of London in June 1940.

== Priesthood ==
Chelliah ordained as Deacon of St Andrew's Cathedral on 20 September 1940, before moving his family to and arriving in Singapore on 31 December 1940, and as a Priest in 1941.

He was an Assistant master at St Andrew's School, Singapore from 1940 to 1946; and its Vice Principal from 1946 to 1961. He was Acting Dean of St Andrew's Cathedral, Singapore from 1943 to 1945. He became Archdeacon of Singapore from 1958 to 1967. He was Priest in charge of St Paul's Church, Singapore from 1961 to 1970. He was an Honorary Canon of St Andrew's Cathedral, Singapore from 1949 to 1971; after which he was Canon Emeritus.

== Personal life ==
Upon his return to Malaya, Chelliah married Mary Ebenezer Rosalind Mani in 1925 and they had six children:

- David Ernest Srinivasagam Chelliah,
- Iris Ponnu Constance Nallayya
- Jazmyn Margurite Elizabeth Chelliah
- Jonathan Chelliah
- Noelle George
- Leaena Tambyah.

His wife Rosalind died on 26 November 1971. Chelliah died at the Toa Payoh Hospital, Singapore at 2.10 am on 2 April 1979 at the age of 85.
