= Death of Mohammad Airyl Amirul Haziq Mohamed Ariff =

2014 fatal child abuse case in Singapore

- Police mugshot of Noraidah Mohd Yussof, who was convicted of fatally abusing her four-year-old son Airyl
- Date: March 2012 – 1 August 2014
- Location: Eunos, Singapore
- Outcome: Noraidah convicted of causing grievous hurt and child abuse; Noraidah sentenced to eight years in prison in 2016; Noraidah's sentence increased to 14 years and six months' jail
- Deaths: Mohammad Airyl Amirul Haziq Mohamed Ariff (4)
- Injuries: None
- Convicted: Noraidah Mohd Yussof (32)
- Verdict: Guilty
- Convictions: Voluntarily causing grievous hurt (two counts)
- Sentence: 14 1/2 years' imprisonment

On 1 August 2014, Singaporean four-year-old Mohammad Airyl Amirul Haziq Mohamed Ariff was hospitalized for severe brain injuries and he died four days later in spite of medical treatment. Airyl's 32-year-old mother Noraidah Mohd Yussof was arrested and charged with voluntarily causing grievous hurt, which was upgraded to murder upon the death of her son. It was later revealed that Noraidah had abused her son for two years, starting from March 2012, and on the date of Airyl's hospitalization, Noraidah had beaten Airyl severely for not properly reciting numbers in Malay. This led to severe head injuries that caused the death of the boy.

After the murder charge was reduced prior to her trial in March 2016, Noraidah was sentenced to jail for eight years in July 2016 after pleading guilty to two counts of causing grievous hurt and two counts of ill-treatment of her son. Upon the prosecution's appeal, her sentence was enhanced to 14 years and six months of imprisonment in July 2017. The case of Airyl's death led to Court of Appeal to request that the government provide them with more discretion to impose enhanced sentences for crimes against young and vulnerable victims.

== Background ==
Mohammad Airyl Amirul Haziq Mohamed Ariff was born in Singapore in October 2009. He was the younger of two children and had one elder sister, who was two years older than him. His biological mother was Noraidah Mohd Yussof, a former bridal model who was divorced in 2012; the identity of Airyl's biological father was unknown. Noraidah later had a boyfriend, who broke up with her in 2014, before she murdered her son.

Airyl, who was two at that time, was first abused by his mother in March 2012, when Noraidah tried to teach him the alphabet, and Airyl did not follow her instructions. This incensed Noraidah and caused her to push him and step on his ribs. Shortly after the incident, Noraidah gave him a paper to scribble on, but Airyl reportedly drew on a sofa. Out of anger, Noraidah twisted and pulled her son's hand with great force.

On 12 March 2012, Airyl was hospitalized at the KK Women's and Children's Hospital, and stayed there until 2 April 2012. Airyl was found to have multiple fractures to his left elbow, left calf, and eighth to 11th ribs. There were also bruises on his forehead and the back of his head, and on various parts of his body. Healed scars were also discovered on his lower legs and lower abdomen. As a result of suspected abuse, Noraidah was referred to the Child Protective Service (CPS), and she lied that the injuries were the result of a fall down a flight of stairs at home and an earlier fall at the playground. Even so, the CPS decided to have Airyl placed under the care of Noraidah's brother and sister-in-law. Four months later, Noraidah moved in to live with the relatives and her son, but there were no further reports of child abuse, so the CPS closed the case on 5 February 2014.

Noraidah and her two children later moved to a rented flat in Eunos, and on 30 July 2014, the abuse resumed. In that case, Airyl was asked to recite certain numbers in Malay, but he was unable to, which provoked Noraidah into shoving Airyl until he fell backwards. This fall caused Airyl to hit the back of his head against a TV console table. Later that day, Airyl soiled the floor and his mother was enraged at this, and she kicked him on the waist and while Airyl was still on the floor, Noraidah also stood on his stomach with both feet for a few seconds.

== Murder ==
Mohammad Airyl Amirul Haziq Mohamed Ariff
- Born: Mohammad Airyl Amirul Haziq Mohamed Ariff c. October 2009; Singapore
- Died: 5 August 2014 (aged 4); KK Women's and Children's Hospital, Singapore
- Cause of death: Bleeding to the brain and a fractured skull
- Known for: Child abuse victim
- Parent(s): Unnamed biological father Noraidah Mohd Yussof (mother)

On 1 August 2014, two days after the brutal assault, Noraidah once again abused her son, and this time, it would result in Airyl's death.

On that day, Noraidah asked Airyl to recite the numbers 11 to 18 in Malay again; however, Airyl did not recite them correctly, and Noraidah angrily shouted at Airyl, who later took a nap. Afterwards, Airyl was once again asked to recite the numbers but he failed to. This caused Noraidah to pull Airyl, who fell backwards on the floor and hit his head. Noraidah stepped onto Airyl's knees with both feet about three to four times before she choked him and pushed him to the floor, grabbing Airyl's neck and lifting him off the floor, pushing Airyl against the wall.

Noraidah only stopped after she saw Airyl gasping for air. The boy fell to the ground and remained motionless, weak and unresponsive. Later on, Noraidah brought Airyl to Changi General Hospital, claiming that Airyl's injuries were due to a fall. Suspected of a lie, Noraidah was arrested for causing hurt to her son, who was later warded at KK Women's and Children's Hospital.

Airyl was found to have suffered head injuries and had to undergo an emergency operation to save his life. Airyl's biological father, who was remarried at that time, went to the hospital with his second wife and other relatives, and hoped that Airyl would recover. However, Airyl's condition remained severe and he was placed on life support, and also developed further complications. Eventually, due to the poor prognosis, Airyl's father and other family members agreed to take him off life support on the doctors' recommendation, and on 5 August 2014, four-year-old Mohammad Airyl Amirul Haziq Mohamed Ariff was pronounced dead. An autopsy was conducted and the cause of Airyl's death was found to be a fractured skull and bleeding in the brain. Various other injuries caused by Noraidah's abuse of the boy, including scars, abrasions and bruises, were also found on Airyl's body.

== Criminal charges ==
Three days after her arrest, on 4 August 2014, 32-year-old Noraidah Mohd Yussof was charged with voluntarily causing grievous hurt. Ten days later, on 14 August 2014, it was reported that in light of her son's death, Noraidah was brought back to court, where her original charge of causing grievous hurt was upgraded to murder, a grave offence that carries the death penalty in Singapore. Noraidah was also charged with abusing and ill-treating her son during the past two years before Airyl's death.

On 9 September 2014, Noraidah was found fit to stand trial for murdering her son. Veteran criminal lawyer Subhas Anandan, who was notable for representing infamous wife-killer Anthony Ler, was engaged by Noraidah's family to defend her in her murder trial. However, Anandan died from a heart attack in 2015 before Noraidah stood trial, and she was represented by another lawyer by the time her trial began in 2016.

== Trial of Noraidah Mohd Yussof ==
Before the beginning of Noraidah's trial, the prosecution, after careful consideration of the facts and circumstances of the case, decided to bring down her murder charge to the original charge of voluntarily causing grievous hurt, which saved Noraidah from facing the death penalty for murdering Airyl. After the death of her original lawyer Subhas Anandan in 2015, Anandan's nephew Sunil Sudheesan, together with Diana Ngiam, took over his uncle's case and represented Noraidah during her trial, while the prosecution was led by April Phang. The trial was presided over by Justice Lee Seiu Kin.

On 28 March 2016, Noraidah pleaded guilty to two counts of causing grievous hurt and another two counts of ill-treatment of her son; the possible punishment for voluntarily causing grievous hurt, which under the Penal Code warrants a jail term of up to ten years with caning, while the ill-treatment of a child, which came under the Children and Young Persons Act, warrants a maximum jail term of four years with a possible fine.

Before her sentencing, a Newton hearing was conducted to determine Noraidah's mental state for the purpose of calibrating an appropriate length of imprisonment for her, as Noraidah's lawyers told the court that she was suffering from Asperger syndrome, a developmental disorder which is similar to autism spectrum disorder but of a milder form. Dr Tommy Tan, a private psychiatrist, agreed with the defence that Noraidah suffered from Asperger syndrome, and having interviewed Noraidah's family, Dr Tan stated that due to the condition, Noraidah, who had some abnormal behaviour since young, was unable to form a bond with Airyl or show empathy towards others. She only had an interest in drawing, writing and modelling, and her refusal to work aside from pursuing a modelling career were factors behind his diagnosis.

The prosecution's two psychiatric experts – Dr Sajith Geetha and Dr Subhash Gupta – disagreed that Noraidah suffered from Asperger's. Dr Subhash testified that Noraidah's inability to show empathy was not a sign of Asperger's, and he testified that Noraidah had some personality aberrations, notably including her high tendency to become violent and act on impulse, and her short temper. Dr Subhash's evidence was corroborated by Dr Sajith, who added that before the abuse and death of Airyl, Noraidah was able to interact normally with her friends and capable of forming romantic relationships with men, which were not the behaviours exhibited by those diagnosed with Asperger's, since individuals with Asperger's have difficulties in communication and socializing with other people. Dr Sajith even brought up the fact that Noraidah had won a secondary school modelling contest, which he used to support his rebuttal of the defence's contention.

On 29 July 2016, the prosecution and defence made their submissions on sentence. The prosecution urged the trial court to sentence Noraidah to imprisonment for 12 years or more, citing that the death of Airyl was "one of the saddest cases of child abuse", and they pointed out that Noraidah violated her parental duty as a mother and never protected her son, and she never suffered from any social communication deficits. The prosecution submitted that Noraidah kept abusing Airyl in cold blood over any signs of behaviour that did not meet her expectations and even resorted to further violence after she pushed Airyl down, and they thus argued for a harsh sentence to be imposed for the purpose of retribution and deterrence. The defence asked for less than ten years' imprisonment, and cited that while the death of Airyl was a sad case, Noraidah had gone overboard as a result of coping with multiple stressors, notably her divorce and later break-up from her former boyfriend, and the financial burden she had to feed the family and pay for her mother's treatment. Noraidah's lawyer Sudheesan also stated that Noraidah, who was reportedly remorseful for murdering her son, would be psychologically haunted by causing Airyl's death, which amounted to a severe punishment and he therefore sought leniency on Noraidah's behalf.

Justice Lee Seiu Kin delivered his verdict on the same day after the end of closing submissions. Justice Lee rejected the defence's contention that she had Asperger syndrome. Instead, he accepted the prosecution's psychiatric evidence that Noraidah had several personality problems, and he found these to be a mitigating factor, as they may have contributed to her inability to cope with multiple stressors and her inability to bond with her son. These were factors that weighed in Justice Lee's mind as he considered the appropriate sentence, and he also accepted that Noraidah was filled with regret for killing her son, and therefore decided to err on the side of leniency in spite of his criticism of the defendant for her conduct. Therefore, Justice Lee sentenced Noraidah to eight years' jail, and backdated her jail term to the date of her arrest on 2 August 2014. Noraidah was spared the cane as Singaporean law prohibits caning for female offenders. Noraidah reportedly broke down in court when the sentence was passed.

== Prosecution's appeal ==
After the end of Noraidah's sentencing trial, the prosecution filed an appeal against her eight-year sentence, on the grounds that the jail term was manifestly inadequate and they maintained their stand to have Noraidah jailed for 12 years or more.

The prosecution's appeal was heard before the Court of Appeal on 6 July 2017, with three judges - two Judges of Appeal Tay Yong Kwang and Steven Chong, and Chief Justice Sundaresh Menon - hearing the appeal. Deputy Public Prosecutor (DPP) Kow Keng Siong argued that the trial judge was wrong to consider Noraidah's personality aberrations as mitigating factors, as these were not part of a recognisable mental disorder. DPP Kow also argued that the law should ensure that lenient sentences should not be imposed on people with an impulsive or aggressive nature, as it might potentially allow these offenders to have an excuse to "give in to their emotions and act out their frustrations without self-restraint". DPP Kow also said that deterrence was a relevant sentencing factor, which the judge should not have left out, and cited the statistics which showed a rise in child abuse cases, from 550 cases in 2015 to 873 cases in 2016. DPP Kow also cited that Noraidah never showed any remorse for her actions, and she had earlier blamed her family for her son's death, claiming that this would not have happened if they also took care of Airyl. On these grounds, DPP Kow sought a sentence of more than 12 years for Noraidah. Noraidah's lawyer Diana Ngiam, however, submitted that the trial court was correct to accept Noraidah's personality aberrations, as well as her inability to cope and bond with her son, as mitigating factors, and that her sentence was not manifestly inadequate.

On the same date, after the completion of the submissions, the Court of Appeal returned with their decision. Chief Justice Menon, who delivered the judgement, stated that the three judges agreed with the prosecution's submissions, stating that the gravity of Noraidah's crime was aggravated by Airyl's young age and his defenceless nature. They stated that as Airyl's mother, Noraidah had a maternal duty to protect him, but instead, she was ruthless and extremely cruel towards him. Furthermore, the three judges admonished Noraidah for her utter lack of remorse and having inflicted "unspeakably severe" abuse on her own biological child, and stated her conduct overall was vicious and heinous.

The appellate court also disagreed with the trial judge that Noraidah's actions amounted to crimes of passion, but believed they were vindictive acts and deliberate responses to Airyl's behaviours and she never acted out of impulse or loss of self-control, as corroborated by the severity of the injuries inflicted. Chief Justice Menon also added that the case was made more tragic by the fact that after the end of the CPS's intervention, Noraidah remained undeterred and thus resumed abusing her son, and ultimately the abuse cost her son his life. The court also said that the judge had erred in accepting the personality aberrations and the financial woes of Noraidah during sentencing, as these are not justifications to explain her abusive behaviour towards her son.

On these grounds, the appellate judges agreed that Noraidah's sentence of eight years was manifestly inadequate, and she deserved to be incarcerated for more than 12 years as what the prosecution proposed. The appellate judges allowed the prosecution's appeal, and therefore raised Noraidah's sentence to 14 1/2 years' imprisonment.

== Aftermath ==
Noraidah has been serving her sentence at Changi Women's Prison since August 2014. If Noraidah completes at least two-thirds of her jail term (equivalent to nine years and eight months) with good behaviour, she was released on parole in April 2024.

In November 2017, after the Court of Appeal released their decision, they called for Parliament to provide them the power to enhance the punishment of child abusers by up to 1.5 times the maximum penalty proscribed, and this proposal was also made to address crimes that target other vulnerable victims like foreign domestic maids and the elderly. The appellate court also set out a sentencing criteria for courts in the future to address violent offences against children and young persons that lead to serious injury or death. They stated that for grievous hurt leading to death, the indicative starting point should be a jail term of about eight years, while those with multiple fractures should have a starting point of three years and six months. As for caning, male offenders below the age of 50 can be subjected to 12 or more strokes of the cane if they voluntarily inflicted grievous hurt that led to the victim's death, and for cases with non-fatal serious injury, the court can choose to impose between six and 12 strokes of the cane.

In 2018, the Parliament of Singapore decided to amend laws to allow for harsher punishments for offenders who commit crimes against vulnerable groups like children, domestic workers and disabled people (whether mentally or physically). Under the amended laws, any convicted offenders can face up to twice the maximum punishment for whichever crimes are committed against these vulnerable groups. The proposed amendments were introduced in early 2019.

== See also ==
- Death of Annie Ee
- Murder of Nursabrina Agustiani Abdullah
- 1999 Ang Mo Kio child abuse case
- 2016 Toa Payoh child abuse case
- List of major crimes in Singapore
