= Changi Hospital =

Hospital in Changi, Singapore

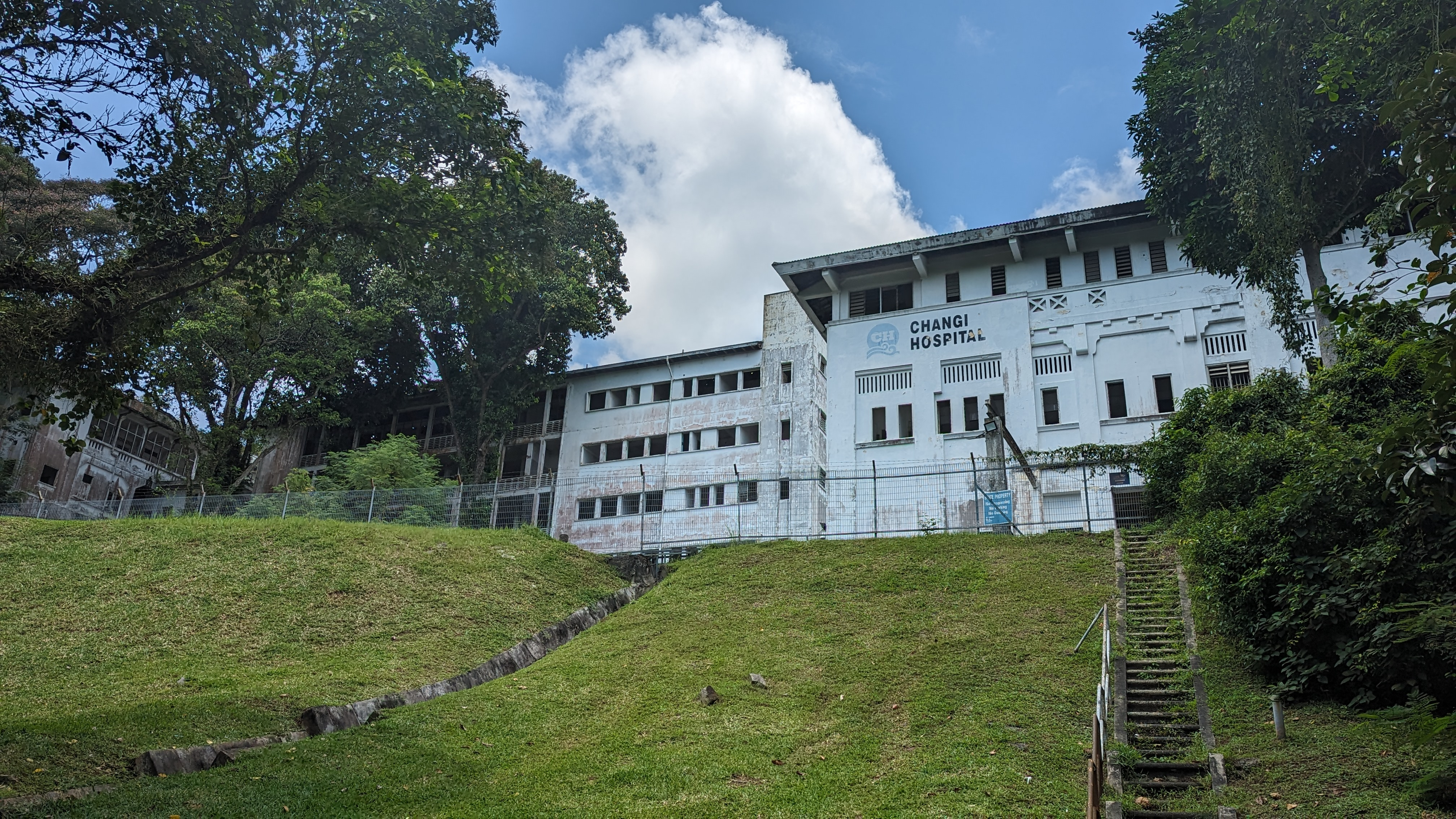
- Changi Hospital

Geography
- Location: 24 Halton Road, Singapore 506997
- Coordinates: 1°23′27.7″N 103°58′50″E

Organisation
- Type: District General

Services
- Emergency department: Accident & Emergency
- Beds: 790

History
- Founded: 1935; 91 years ago
- Closed: 15 December 1997; 28 years ago

Changi Hospital is an abandoned general hospital located in Changi, Singapore. Its closure came with the merging with the former Toa Payoh Hospital and was renamed as the Changi General Hospital, which relocated new operations to nearby Simei, not far from Changi. It began winding down activities in February 1997 and was completely abandoned by December. Various urban legends refer to the hospital as haunted.

== History ==
What is now the abandoned Changi Hospital was part of a military barracks by the British government from 1929 to 1935 to house Royal Engineer and Royal Artillery units involved in the coastal defence of Singapore as part of Changi Cantonment. The currently-empty hospital included two buildings namely Block 24 and Block 37 as part of a set of military barracks on one of four elevations at Changi Point known as Barrack Hill; Block 24 as H-Block and Block 37 as a small medical facility serving the barracks. This later became part of the Royal Engineers barracks known as Kitchener Barracks. Royal Artillery units were housed at Roberts Barracks (now part of Changi Air Base West), while Selarang Barracks was built to house infantry units.

Based on Royal Engineer Medical Corp reports and dispatches from General Office Commanding General Arthur Percival, the "hospital" was not in use during the Battle for Malaya and Singapore, whereas field hospitals were in operation at various locations in Changi, the No. 17 Combined General Hospital established at Roberts Barracks and No. 1 Malayan General Hospital at Selarang Barracks. No mention at all is made of a working hospital at Kitchener Barracks at any time. The cantonment itself was evacuated on 12 February 1942, just days before the fall of Singapore. With POWs moved to the various sites across Changi Cantonment following the surrender, POW hospitals were established at Selarang and Roberts Barracks prior to it being consolidated at Roberts Barracks—where the Changi Murals would be painted.

During the period of the Japanese occupation of Singapore, Kitchener Barracks was used as a Prisoner of War (POW) Camp until May 1943 and housed POWs from volunteer units including David Marshall, a lawyer and future Chief Minister and several members of the academia from Raffles College, who were able to introduce "university" level education to the POWs. Kitchener Barracks later housed units of the Imperial Japanese Army involved in supervising the construction of an airstrip in Changi.

Following the reoccupation of Singapore, the airstrip at Changi was strengthened for use by Royal Air Force (RAF) transport aircraft. Subsequently, in 1946, an RAF air station, RAF Changi was established around the airstrip, with Block 37. becoming Station Sick Quarters. The setting up of the Far East Air Force Command (FEAF), saw to it using the barrack blocks on Barrack Hill for its HQ and the hill was subsequently renamed FEAF Hill.

In 1947, Block 37 and the converted H-Block (Block 24) barrack, became part of the newly established RAF Hospital Changi. In 1962, a new building was added to complement the two prewar-era blocks that made up the then-current hospital. Block 161, a large modern addition-structure, was constructed between Blocks 24 and 37 to join them together over FEAF Hill, which prior to that divided the two buildings, making access between them difficult. From 1947 until 1971, the RAF used the hospital to serve not only its service-personnel, but foreign troops from the Commonwealth, not least Australian and New Zealand troops, as well as even UN soldiers during the Korean War too (between 1950 and 1953). This arrangement continued until Singapore claimed full independence in August 1965. From that time on, the British commenced a gradual withdrawal of their military presence from Singapore, following their East of Suez policy, which called for the eventual British departure from Southeast Asia. The hospital was renamed as the ANZUK Hospital in 1971, following the large-scale exit of British troops based in Singapore before that year and served ANZUK (Australia, New Zealand and United Kingdom (UK)) servicemen. The ANZUK unit was disbanded in 1975 and it was renamed the UK Military Hospital, even though British forces had almost entirely been withdrawn from Singapore. In December of that same year, the British finally withdrew the last of their troops and the hospital was handed over to the Singapore Armed Forces (SAF) and renamed as Singapore Armed Forces Hospital. The SAF Hospital catered to medical care of SAF personnel and their immediate families. Gradually, the hospital's services was also extended to members of the public, and rates were charged to the same as other government-run public hospitals elsewhere in Singapore.

The SAF Hospital later merged with the nearby 36-bed Changi Chalet Hospital in 1976 and renamed as Changi Hospital after the former was handed over to the Ministry of Health. This arrangement lasted until 15 December in 1997, when Changi Hospital was shut down after merging with Toa Payoh Hospital to form Changi General Hospital, after which, the old hospital ceased operations and was left empty ever since, with the ownership of the old hospital being transferred to the Singapore Land Authority (SLA) which originally had posted security-guards and their guard-dogs to protect the old hospital from trespassers (at this time, the compound was not fenced up yet and many trespassers, both locals and foreigners, often enter the abandoned premises to conduct activities such as ghost-hunting, vandalism (both graffiti vandalism and outright damaging of the property), consumption of drugs and even Satanic worshipping).

In 2006, the SLA put up the entire site for commercial-based leasing. The tender put up was won by Bestway Properties, which proposed to build a luxurious spa-resort in the old hospital by the first half of 2008. The project fell through and was never commenced (partly due to financial difficulties during the recession at that period of time) and the site was returned to the SLA in 2010, which has since fenced up the entire compound and installed security-cameras and motion-sensors in multiple locations in and around the abandoned hospital to replace the security personnel needed to guard the area.

Universal Studios Singapore (USS) has built a small replica of the former hospital in its theme-park to raise awareness of the haunted building, which becomes popular amongst visitors especially during the Halloween period. Since its abandonment, many horror stories and paranormal tales have emerged from the place, ranging from tales of an alleged nurse roaming the compound to poltergeists haunting the old hospital. However, there is almost no substantial proof to back these up, aside from several photos or videos taken outside or within the abandoned hospital.

On 3 November 2021, a proposal to transform the Old Changi Hospital into a stargazing observatory and aviation viewing deck won a competition aimed at revamping the Changi Point area. It was named Ascending to the Sky and placed first in the open category in a contest for ideas to repurpose the old hospital. The competition was organised by the Singapore Land Authority (SLA) and Urban Redevelopment Authority (URA).

== Hauntings ==
The vacated hospital compound was popular with film-makers after the Singapore Land Authority began a short-term rental programme of the abandoned and derelict buildings that was once Changi Hospital. Many MediaCorp television series such as Growing Up, The Crime Hunters, C.I.D. and Incredible Tales were partly filmed at the now-abandoned hospital, which by the 2000s had been badly damaged by vandals and criminals. Around this time, Old Changi Hospital was declared by many Singaporeans, young and old alike, to be one of the most haunted locations in the whole country. The buildings are said to be haunted by the souls of the victims of the Japanese Occupation, homeless ghosts and the spirits of those who died in the hospital. In 2017, a video of sightings of a nurse carrying a baby in the haunted hospital circulated around the Internet, sparking debate on its authenticity and the spookiness of the former hospital and the supposed paranormal activities inside.

The once-abandoned and derelict buildings and its ghostly reputation were the basis for the 2010 mockumentary Haunted Changi, which, using found-footage, told of a small group of paranormal investigators going inside the hospital to learn of its horrifying past and ended with terrifying outcomes to each member. Areas of the old hospital alleged to be haunted include the old mortuary which has since been demolished, the tile-walled operating theatre and the old hospital's Accident-and-Emergency (A&E) building (located below the hill from where the main hospital is located at has long been demolished already). There is also a widespread belief of the presence of underground bunkers beneath Changi Hospital (from the days when it was a military base), although there is currently no available access to them and their alleged entry-points (rumoured to be 3) are also closed off. A picture had been taken at Changi Aloha Chalet near the hospital and allegedly showed what was seen as a ghost. According to the owners of the photo, their room was located right opposite Changi Hospital and the abandoned Aloha Changi Resort.
