= Leaena Tambyah =

Singaporean special education advocate (1937–2023)

Leaena Tambyah PBM BBM
- Born: Leaena Chelliah; 28 June 1937; Penang, Malaya, Straits Settlements
- Died: 8 September 2023 (aged 86); Singapore
- Education: B.S.
- Alma mater: University of Birmingham
- Occupation: Social worker
- Known for: Disability rights and special education advocacy
- Spouse: John Anantharajah Tambyah (m. 1964; died 2011)
- Children: 2, Paul Anantharajah Tambyah (son)
- Father: Devasahayam David Chelliah

Leaena Tambyah (born Leaena Chelliah; 28 June 1937 – 8 September 2023) PBM BBM, was a Singaporean special education advocate who founded the country's first school for children with multiple disabilities. The school was originally called the Handicapped Children's Playgroup, but went on to become the AWWA School. Tambyah also founded a programme called TEACH ME (Therapy and Educational Assistance for Children in Mainstream Education) to try to bring disabled children into mainstream schools, and to provide mobile therapy services to children whose families could not afford to bring them to a hospital.

== Early life and education ==
Leaena Chelliah was born in Penang, Malaya on 28 June 1937 to The Venerable Reverend Dr. Devasahayam David Chelliah and his wife Rosalind. She was the youngest of the six children. She and her family moved from Penang to Singapore in 1940, when her father was appointed headmaster of Saint Andrew's School. She attended Raffles Girls' School, then Raffles Institution, before moving to England to earn her bachelor's degree in social science at the University of Birmingham. She returned to Singapore in 1960, and the next year began working as an assistant director at the Ministry of Social Affairs.

== Special education advocacy ==
Tambyah left her job at the Ministry of Social Affairs when she became pregnant with the first of her children. She then worked part-time as a social worker and volunteered extensively. During this time she began volunteering at the Asian Women's Welfare Association (AWWA), where she helped run a family service centre.

In 1979, she organized the Handicapped Children's Playgroup, a weekly playgroup at the Church of St. Ignatius for a small number of children with multiple disabilities, who at the time were not accepted to mainstream or special needs schools. This was the first school for multiply-disabled children in Singapore. She chaired the playgroup from 1979 until 1985. In 1986, the playgroup won a United Nations Community Excellence Award. The playgroup has since become the AWWA School.

Tambyah organized a project called TEACH ME (Therapy and Educational Assistance for Children in Mainstream Education) in 1991. This project brought some children from special needs schools into mainstream schools. It also included a mobile therapy clinic to treat physically disabled children whose parents could not afford to bring them to hospitals for therapy. In 1994, the Family Resource and Training Centre gave TEACH ME the Innovative Programme Award.

In 1984, Tambyah was awarded the Public Service Medal for her work. In 1991, she earned a special volunteer award from the Community Chest of Singapore. In 1994, she received the Public Service Star, and was named Her World Woman of the Year for her work to help children with special needs. In 2011, she was given the Special Recognition Award at the President's Volunteerism & Philanthropy Awards.

== Personal life ==
While attending the Raffles Girls' School, in 1953, she met Dr. John Anantharajah Tambyah (1938–2011), who had attended the Raffles Institution. They married in 1964, and had a son, Professor Paul Anantharajah Tambyah, and a daughter.

=== Death ===
Tambyah was diagnosed with a blood disorder in March 2023. She later suffered a stroke in September 2023 and her two children Paul and Malini put her into palliative care. She died a week later, on 8 September 2023, at the age of 86.

Tambyah was cremated at the Mandai Crematorium and Columbarium Complex and her ashes was scattered off the coast, at Changi, where she and her late husband once dated as teenagers.

== Notable works ==
- Three Special Friends with Kathleen Chia - 2000
- D D Chelliah: Man of Faith, Master Teacher - 2007
