= Eastern Health Alliance =

Geography
- Location: Tampines Plaza, Singapore

Organisation
- Type: Regional Health System

Services

History
- Opened: 18 November 2011
- Closed: 2018

Links
- Website: http://www.easternhealth.sg
- Lists: Hospitals in Singapore

Eastern Health Alliance (Abbreviation: CGH; Chinese: 东部医疗联盟; Malay: Gabungan Perkhidmatan Kesihatan Timur) was a regional health system in the east of Singapore.

== History ==
The Eastern Health Alliance was officially launched on 18 November 2011 by founding members Changi General Hospital, St. Andrew's Community Hospital, SingHealth Polyclinics and The Salvation Army Peacehaven Nursing Home. This was in line with the national direction to make healthcare ongoing rather than episodic, especially for people with chronic conditions like diabetes, stroke, cancer, and lung and heart diseases.

Guided by its vision, "Towards seamless quality care – together", it sought to gradually reshape Singapore's model of healthcare to meet the challenges of a growing and ageing population.

In Jan 2018, the Eastern Health Alliance merged with SingHealth as part of a public health restructuring exercise.

== Integrated care programmes ==
The Eastern Health Alliance was focused on delivering a range of healthcare services, from early detection, disease prevention and management, through to ongoing care. It developed a range of integrated care programmes for the people of eastern Singapore.

=== Eastern Community Health Outreach ===
A community-based chronic disease prevention programme offered in partnership with grassroots organisations. The programme included health screenings, health coaching and healthy lifestyle activities, which aim to intervene early to delay the onset of chronic diseases such as diabetes, high blood pressure and high cholesterol.

=== Health Management Unit ===
The Health Management Unit is set up to assist patients who need help to manage their long-term conditions. These patients received advice from nurse tele-carers on medication, diet and lifestyle, how to monitor their condition and look out for signs of deterioration, helping them stay healthy for as long as possible. Those who needed more help would receive further guidance and support in between medical visits.

=== Community Health Centre ===
The Community Health Centre support general practitioners by providing services for patients with long-term conditions. Services included eye screening, foot screening, health monitoring and education about diet, lifestyle and medication. The first centre, located in Tampines, was helmed by senior nurses and allied health professionals with experience in caring for patients with chronic conditions.

=== Changi General Hospital-St. Andrew’s Community Hospital partnership ===
The positioning of St. Andrew's Community Hospital (SACH) right next to Changi General Hospital (CGH) enabled a transfer of care for more than 4,000 patients since 2005. Patients who no longer require acute care were transferred to SACH for rehabilitation and continuing medical care. SACH and CGH are connected by a covered link bridge. This close proximity helps facilitate better coordinated and integrated care for SACH patients through the sharing of medical records and clinical support services, and consultations by visiting CGH specialists.

=== Transitional Care ===
Transitional Care helps to bridge the gap between hospital and home for patients with complex or multiple care needs. It aimed to stabilise, rehabilitate, and help patients and their caregivers cope with care at home. It also aimed to reduce unnecessary re-admissions to the hospital. The Transitional Care team comprised doctors, nurses, therapists, dietitians, pharmacists and medical social workers.

=== Grace Corner ===
A facility set up in The Salvation Army Peacehaven Nursing Home to provide rehabilitation services for patients with long-term debilitating conditions, and training for caregivers. Medical and nursing services, as well as lifestyle activities are provided. The aim was for patients to be fit enough to return home and integrate back into the community.

=== Home Care Service ===
St. Andrew's Community Hospital's Home Care Service attended to the nursing needs of patients residing in the east. These patients were discharged from acute care hospitals or community hospitals and usually have medical histories of strokes, fractures and multiple diseases. Common nursing care provided to them included changing their urinary catheters; nasogastric tubes for feeding, wound care, dressings, and removal of stitches after a surgery.
