= Haunted Changi =

- Directed by: Andrew Lau
- Produced by: Sheena Chung
- Starring: Sheena Chung; Andrew Lau; Farid Azlam
- Production company: Mythopolis Pictures
- Release date: 2 September 2010
- Running time: 80 minutes
- Country: Singapore
- Languages: English; Mandarin
- Box office: $555,833

Haunted Changi (Chinese: 幽灵樟宜), is a 2010 Singaporean found footage horror film directed by Andrew Lau. The film gained attention online prior to its release due to online marketing.

== Plot ==
Film-makers Andrew, Sheena and Farid enter the abandoned Changi Hospital to film a documentary film on the supposed paranormal happenings that occur in the hospital.

== Cast ==
- Sheena Chung
- Andrew Lau
- Farid Azlam

== Release ==
The film was released in theatres on 2 September 2010. It managed to earn $48,992 on the first day. It was also released in Japan. The film earned $555,833.

The film was released on DVD in December 2010, and sold 2,000 copies in the first four days.

== Reception ==
Kurt Dalhke of DVD Talk wrote a positive review of the film, writing that "Lau and crew's characterizations work fantastically, so when the camera is rushing urgently through those narrow, sickly tunnels underneath the hospital, rounding corner after blind corner on the way to who knows what, we're right there in person feeling the terror, the almost unbearable tension."

John Lui of The Straits Times gave the film three stars out of five in his review of the film, stating, "Haunted Changi takes huge chances with keeping the world of the documentary intact. There are small issues, such as the camera tracking a little too smoothly in some spots, and larger ones, such as when spooks, both computer-generated and played by actors, appear." Juliana June Rasul of The New Paper gave the film two-and-a-half stars out of five, stating, "If there is any sense of creepiness, it is provided purely by the location." Chen Yunhong of Lianhe Wanbao gave the film three stars out of five. Li Yiyun of gave the film three stars out of five for entertainment and two and a half stars out of five for art. Zheng Jingyou of My Paper gave the film two and a half stars out of five.
