= Allocution =

Formal statement by a defendant who has been found guilty prior to being sentenced

An allocution, or allocutus, is a formal statement made to a court by the defendant who has been found guilty before being sentenced. It is part of the criminal procedure in some jurisdictions using common law.

== Concept ==
An allocution allows the defendant to explain why the sentence should be lenient. In plea bargains, an allocution may be required of the defendant. The defendant admits specifically and in detail the actions and their reasons in exchange for a reduced sentence.

In principle, that removes any doubt as to the exact nature of the defendant's guilt in the matter.

The term allocution is used generally only in jurisdictions in the United States, but there are analogous processes in other common law countries. In many other jurisdictions, it is for the defense lawyer to speak of their mitigation on their client's behalf, and the defendant rarely has the opportunity to speak.

== Australia ==
In Australia, the term allocutus is used by the Clerk of Arraigns or another formal associate of the court.

It is generally phrased as: "Prisoner at the Bar, you have been found Guilty by a jury of your peers of the offence of XYZ. Do you have anything to say as to why the sentence of this Court should not now be passed upon you?"

The defense counsel will then make a plea in mitigation (also called submissions on penalty) in an attempt to mitigate the relative seriousness of the offense, and heavily refer to and rely upon the defendant's previous good character and good works, if any.

The right to make a plea in mitigation is absolute: if a judge or magistrate refuses to hear such a plea or does not properly consider it, the sentence can be overturned on appeal.

== United States ==
Alloculation rights (albeit with some variations in keeping with federalism) are also enshrined at the state level. In its absence, a sentence but not the conviction may be overturned, resulting in the need for a new sentencing hearing. In the federal system, Federal Rules of Criminal Procedure 32(i)(4) provides that the court must "address the defendant personally in order to permit the defendant to speak or present any information to mitigate the sentence".

The Federal Public Defender recommends that defendants speak in terms of how a lenient sentence will be sufficient but not greater than necessary to comply with the statutory directives set forth in 18 U.S.C. § 3553(a).

== See also ==
- Confession (law)
- Newton hearing, the equivalent in England and Wales
- John Brown's last speech
