= Paul Tambyah =

Singaporean doctor, professor and politician (born 1965)

Dr. Paul Tambyah
- பால் தம்பையா
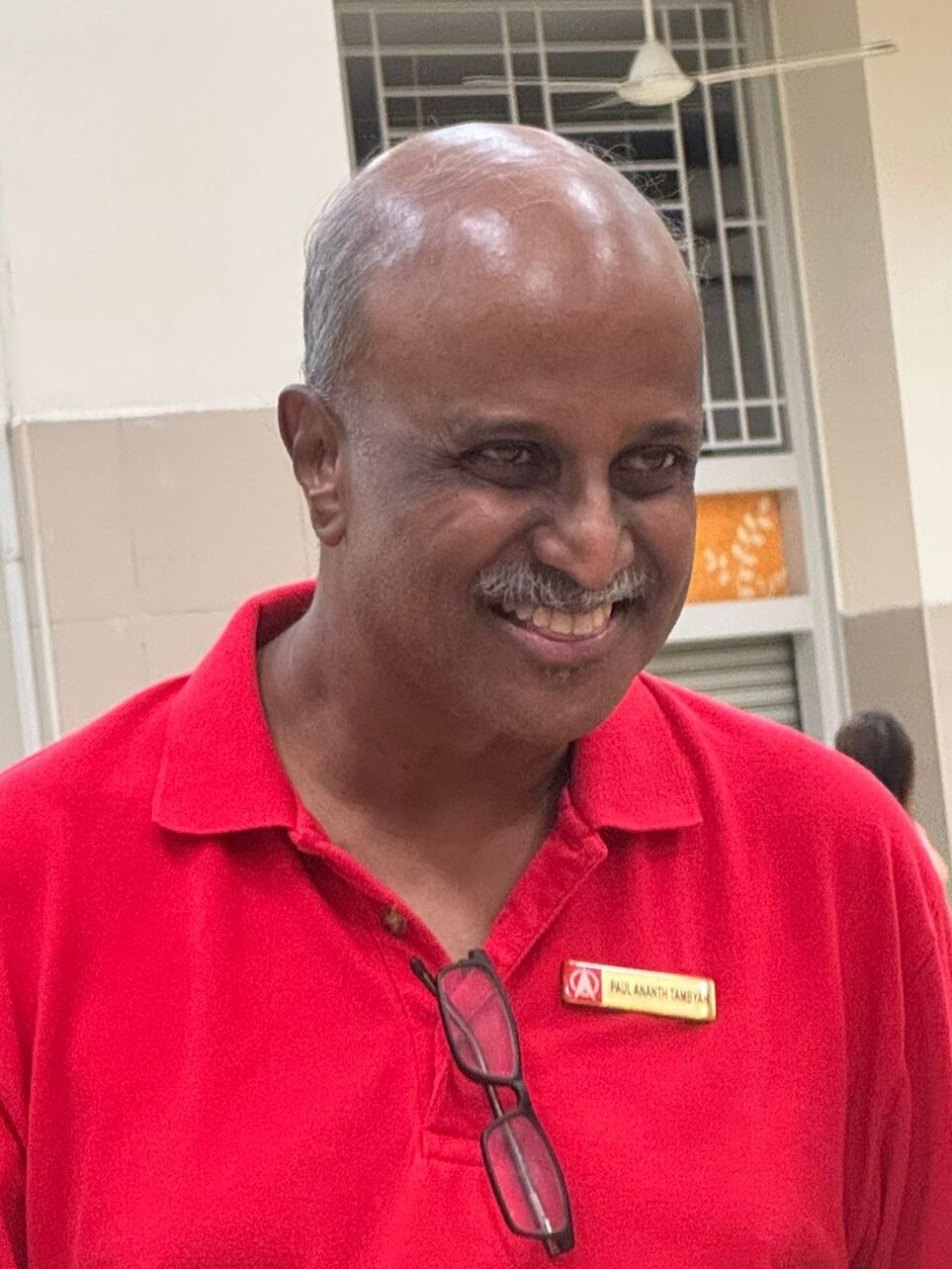
- Tambyah campaigning during the 2025 general election

8th Chairman of the Singapore Democratic Party
- Incumbent
- Assumed office 26 September 2017
- Preceded by: Wong Souk Yee
- Secretary-General: Chee Soon Juan

Personal details
- Born: Paul Anantharajah Tambyah; 5 February 1965 (age 61) State of Singapore, Malaysia
- Party: Singapore Democratic Party (2015–present)
- Spouse: Siok Kuan Tambyah (m. 1991)
- Parents: John Tambyah (father); Leaena Tambyah (mother)
- Education: Bachelor of Medicine, Bachelor of Surgery
- Alma mater: National University of Singapore; University of Wisconsin
- Occupation: Infectious Diseases Expert
- Profession: Physician
- Website: Paul Tambyah on Facebook
- Medical career
- Field: Medicine
- Institutions: National University Hospital; Yong Loo Lin School of Medicine, National University of Singapore
- Sub-specialties: Infectious diseases
- Research: Influenza; Dengue; CAUTI; COVID-19

Paul Anantharajah Tambyah (Note: Tamil: பால் ஆனந்தராஜா தம்பையா, romanized: Pāl Āṉantarājā Tampaiyā) (born 5 February 1965) is a Singaporean doctor and professor of infectious diseases, a politician, and a writer who has been serving as chairman of the Singapore Democratic Party since 2017. He is the President of the Asia Pacific Society of Clinical Microbiology and Infection and was the President of the International Society for Infectious Diseases from 2022 to 2025 and served as its immediate past-President.

== Early life and education ==
Born in Singapore to the endocrinologist Dr John Tambyah and social worker Leaena Chelliah on 5 February 1965, Tambyah learned Mandarin as a second language in Saint Andrew's School. He later attended Raffles Institution in 1981.

Tambyah graduated from the National University of Singapore with Bachelor of Medicine, Bachelor of Surgery to become a doctor in 1988.

In 1991, Tambyah married Dr Siok Kuan, a senior lecturer of marketing from NUS Business School.

Tambyah did his postgraduate training in Infectious disease under Dr Dennis G. Maki at the University of Wisconsin and graduated in 1999.

== Career ==
=== Medical career ===
After completing his training in Wisconsin, he returned to Singapore as infectious diseases consultant at National University Hospital. In 2000 he became one of the committee members of the Action for AIDS Singapore, the only HIV/AIDS agency in Singapore first founded in 1988. In 2001 Tambyah became an associate Professor of Medicine.

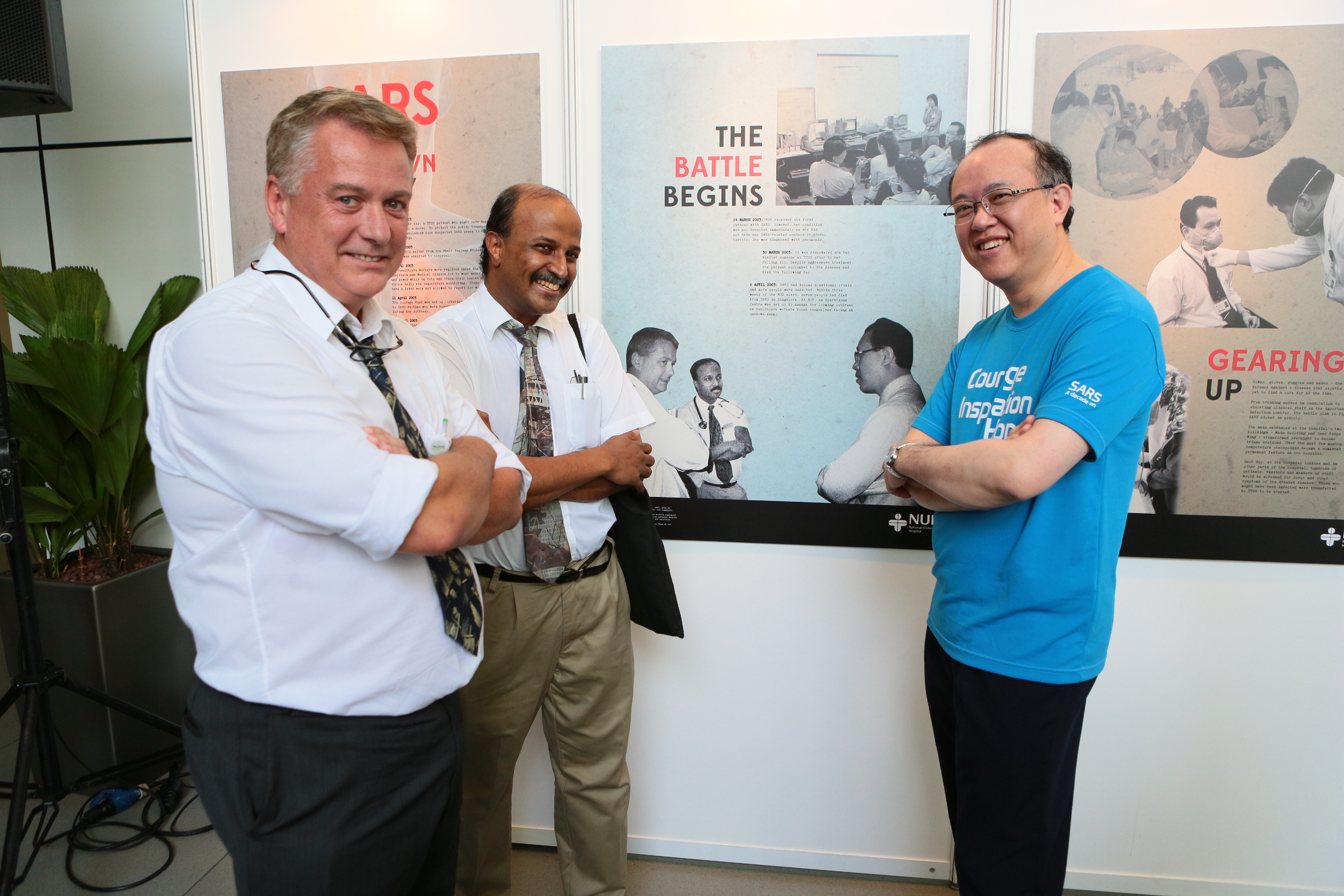
Reunion of Singapore medical staff (from left: Dale Fisher, Paul Tambyah) on the 10th Anniversary of the SARS outbreak in Singapore in 2013.

During the SARS outbreak in 2003, Tambyah helped establish the NUH Division of Infectious Diseases, with Professor Dale Fisher and trainee Dr Louis Chai joined in December 2004. Since then, the Division has grown to include 13 consultants, a resident physician and 2 senior residents as of 2024.

In 2011, Tambyah became the President of the Asia-Pacific Society of Clinical Microbiology and Infection, and led the Singapore Society of Infectious Diseases from 2011 to 2015. Tambyah became a full professor on 5 July 2013.

Tambyah became the assistant Dean of Yong Loo Lin School of Medicine, National University of Singapore in 2015. In June 2020, he became a president-elect of the International Society for Infectious Diseases, set to become the first Singaporean to hold the position and was expected to start his term in 2022.

On 6 December 2020, Tambyah received a Red Ribbon Award by Action for AIDS Singapore for his contributions to HIV-related causes.

On 5 October 2021, Tambyah was recognised as one of the four eminent senior clinicians to receive the Distinguished Senior Clinician Award as conferred by the Ministry of Health in Singapore.

On 20 December 2022, Tambyah became the new President of the International Society of Infectious Diseases Executive Committee, replacing Alison Holmes. This eventually fulfilled the two-year speculation as he has become the first Singaporean President of the International Society of Infectious Diseases. His tenure as President ended on 27 January 2025, and would currently serve as its immediate past-President.

Tambyah was the recipient of the Commendation Medal (COVID-19) and the COVID-19 Resilience Medal of the National Awards (COVID-19) awarded by the Prime Minister's Office to individuals and teams in recognition of their public spirit and contributions to Singapore's fight during the COVID-19 pandemic in Singapore for over two years.

Currently, he is the Senior Consultant, Infectious Diseases Division, Department of Medicine, National University Hospital.

=== Activism ===
Tambyah was noted to be one of the founding members of MARUAH Singapore, a human rights organization which was founded in 2007 in Singapore. Due to the limitations of civil society activism, he eventually left the organisation and entered politics the day before Nomination Day for the 2015 Singapore General Election.

=== Political career ===
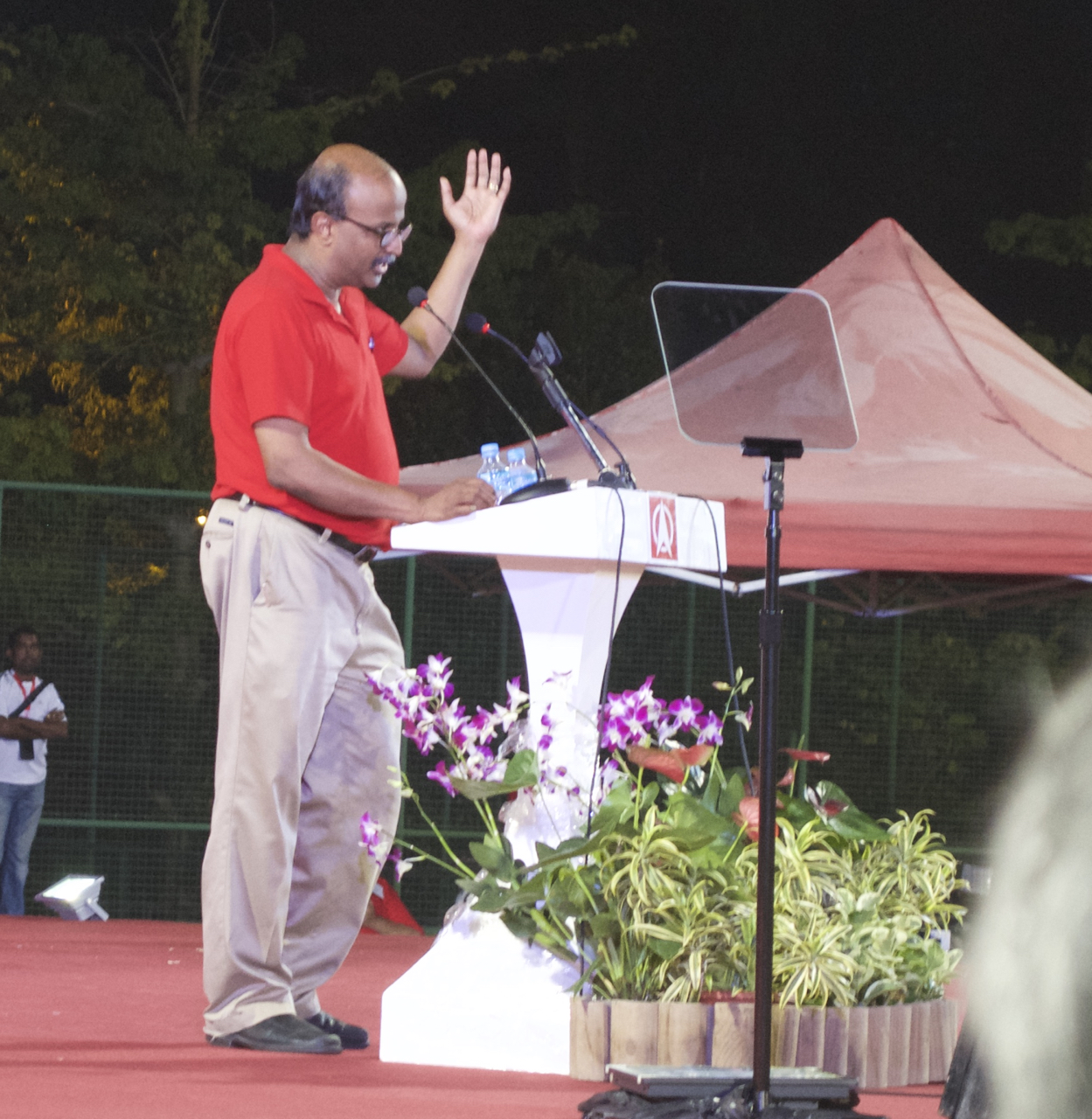
Tambyah at a Singapore Democratic Party rally during the 2015 general election

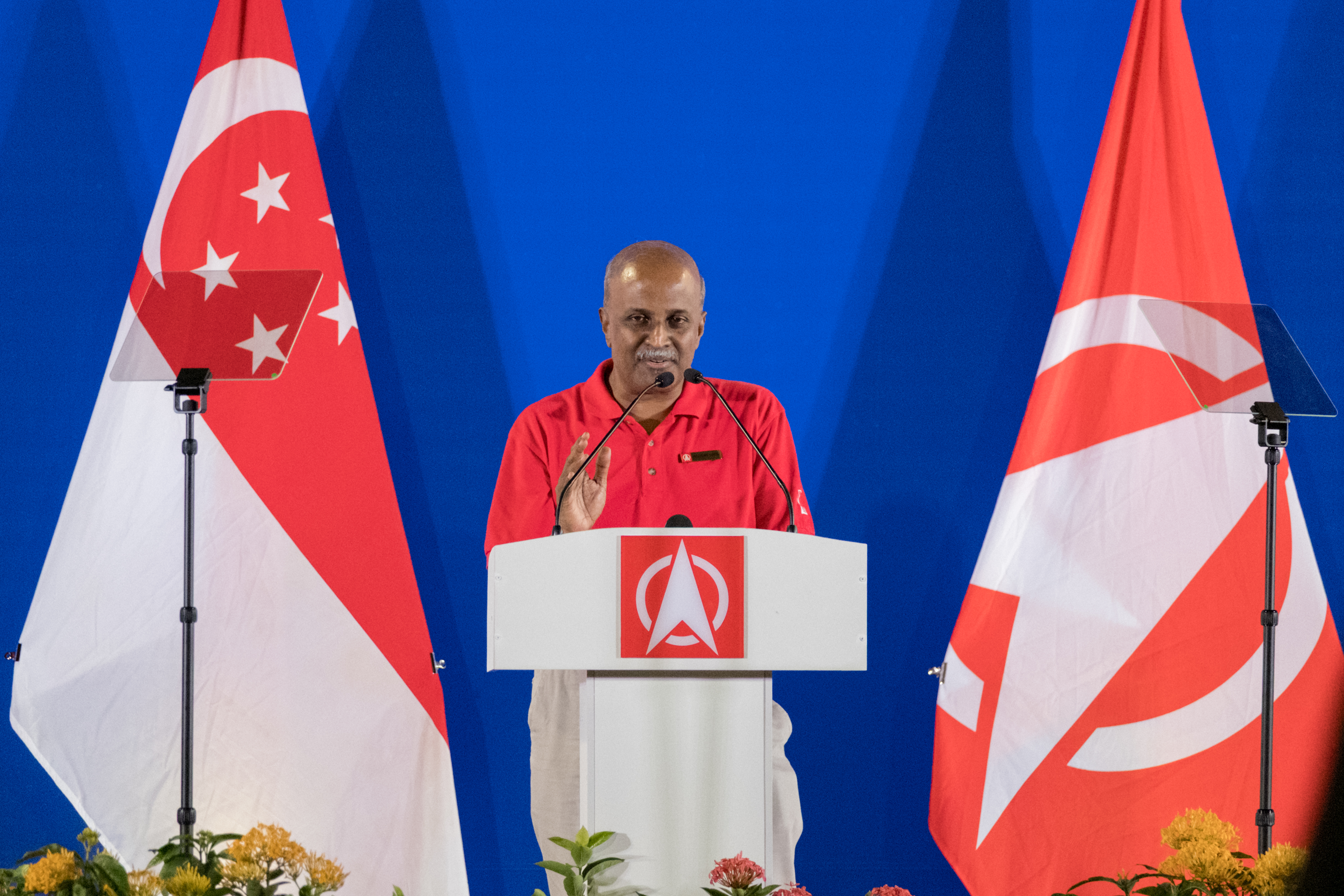
Tambyah at a Singapore Democratic Party rally on 28 April 2025.

Tambyah started getting involved with the Singapore Democratic Party in 2010 and spoke as a guest speaker at the SDP rallies during the 2011 Singaporean general election. He was one of the two potential candidates with party treasurer Vincent Wijeysingha for the 2013 Punggol East by-election in January 2013, before the party announced its decision not to contest and backed Workers' Party's Lee Li Lian to compete against the People's Action Party's Koh Poh Koon.

Tambyah became a member of the SDP's Healthcare Advisory Panel in July 2013. Tambyah officially joined the SDP on 31 August 2015.

In 2015, he was fielded as a candidate as part of the SDP team along with Chee Soon Juan, Sidek Mallek and Chong Wai Fung and contested against PAP's Vivian Balakrishnan, Sim Ann, Liang Eng Hwa, and Christopher de Souza for the Holland–Bukit Timah Group Representation Constituency (GRC) in the 2015 Singaporean general election. The SDP team lost to the PAP team, garnering 33.40 percent of the votes.

On 26 September 2017, he was elected as Chairman by the CEC members during the Singapore Democratic Party 18th Ordinary Party Conference, replacing Wong Souk Yee.

On 30 June 2020, Tambyah was fielded as a SDP candidate against PAP's Liang Eng Hwa in Bukit Panjang Single Member Constituency (SMC) during the 2020 Singaporean general election. He lost the election to Liang with 46.27 percent of the votes.

In March 2025, it was announced that Tambyah would continue to contest in the same ward, Bukit Panjang SMC, again in the 2025 general elections. In the 2025 general election, Tambyah was unsuccessful a second time as he only garnered 38.59% of the vote as compared to Liang's 61.41%. He attributed his loss in Bukit Panjang SMC to a lack of resources within the SDP as compared to the PAP.
