= Dale Fisher =

Australian physician (born 1960)

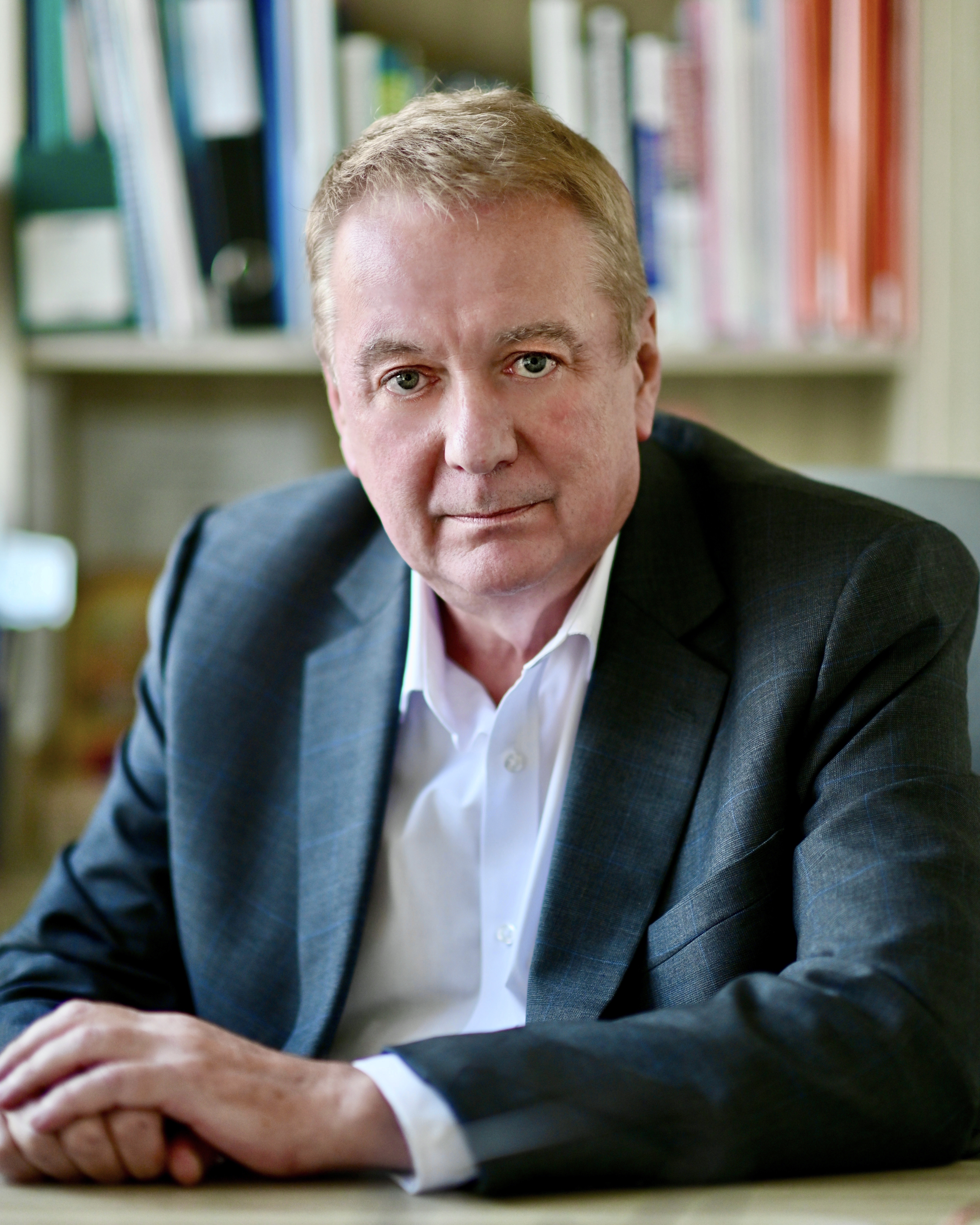
- Dale Fisher in 2023
- Born: Dale Andrew Fisher; 1960 (age 65–66); Melbourne, Australia
- Education: Camberwell Grammar School, Melbourne, Victoria; Hutchins School, Hobart, Tasmania, United World College of South East Asia, Singapore, University of Tasmania, Australia (MBBS)
- Medical career
- Field: Medicine, Infectious Diseases
- Institutions: National University Hospital; National University of Singapore
- Website: www.nuh.com.sg/patients-visitors/Pages/find-a-doctor-details.aspx?docid=Dale_Fisher

Dale Andrew Fisher (born 1960) is an Australian infectious diseases physician who specialises in Infectious Diseases and a Senior Consultant in the Division of Infectious Diseases at the National University Hospital, Singapore. He is also a professor of medicine at the Yong Loo Lin School of Medicine, National University of Singapore (2004 -), and the chair of the National Infection Prevention and Control Committee through the Ministry of Health, Singapore (2013 -). In 2020, he became group chief of Medicine for National University Health Systems.

== Early life and education ==
In 1976, he attended United World College of South East Asia in Singapore under an Australian government scholarship.

== Career and research ==
Fisher was also the infectious disease physician who attended to comedian Jerry Lewis, when the late comedian was admitted to hospital for meningitis while on tour in Darwin. Lewis, when interviewed by Larry King, said "God must have put him in 'the bush' (a.k.a. Darwin) because Dr Fisher was the world's best infectious disease physician."

=== Bali Bombings - 2002 ===
Following the bombing, Fisher wrote an article titled "The Bali bombings of 12 October 2002: lessons in disaster management for physicians", which was published in 2003. Fisher's team highlighted that hospital-based physicians should see themselves as a sizeable and flexible group with the ability to contribute in a variety of ways during a disaster.

=== SARS - 2003 ===
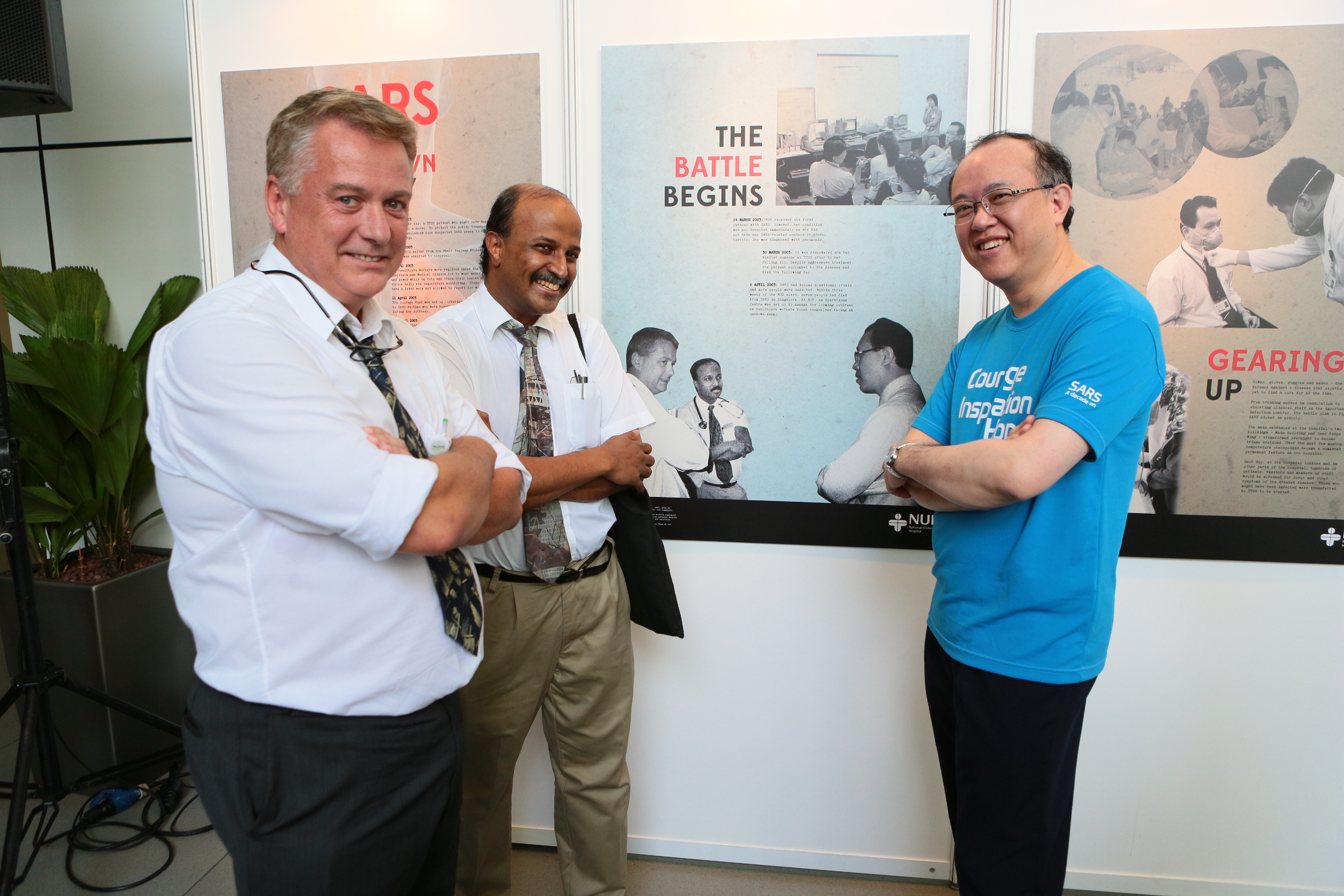
Reunion of Singapore medical staff (from left: Fisher, Paul Tambyah) on the 10th Anniversary of the SARS outbreak in Singapore

During the SARS pandemic in 2003 in Singapore, Fisher with colleagues published several articles related to "Lessons from Singapore". In these articles, it was described that SARS had demonstrated a remarkable efficiency in transmission within hospitals. In fact, 76% of SARS cases in Singapore were acquired in hospitals. They also looked at the circumstances that caused transmission within hospitals, despite the use of personal protective equipment (PPE).

The outbreak in hospitals resulted in dramatic changes in triage and infection-control policies.

In a separate article titled "Atypical presentations of SARS" published in The Lancet, Fisher and colleagues examined the difficulties of managing SARS cases without a diagnostic test. This letter described how the World Health Organization's criteria for probable or suspected SARS case had been misinterpreted. They were intended for epidemiological purposes but instead were used for triage for which they were not adequately sensitive.

=== Methicillin resistant Staphylococcus aureus - 2008 ===
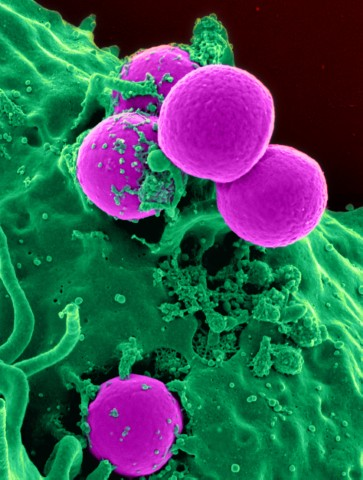

In the article titled "Methicillin-resistant Staphylococcus aureus Control in Singapore– Moving Forward", he described how MRSA infection in hospitals could be prevented and should not be considered as an accepted tolerable by-product of healthcare. Failure to implement long-term sustainable infection control initiatives is not an option. It was also concluded that the control of MRSA in Singapore could be achieved, but it required implementation of many varied control measures across health services, and possibly would take a decade to do so.

Among many other papers on MRSA, in 2013 he published "Sustained MRSA control in a hyper-endemic tertiary acute care hospital with infrastructure challenges in Singapore". It highlighted falls in bacteraemia, all clinical specimens as well as acquisition rates as a result of the previously described interventions.

For their efforts in reducing the rate of MRSA superbug infection from 1 in 10 patients to 1 in 40, Fisher and his colleagues were awarded the National Clinical Excellence Team Award in 2013 by the Ministry of Health, Singapore.

=== COVID-19 ===
During the ongoing COVID-19 pandemic, which began in Wuhan, China, Fisher was part of the WHO delegation that visited China to investigate technical aspects of transmission, severity and interventions preventing spread of the emerging virus. The subsequent report outlined how the world could respond to the outbreak, but warned that the world was not prepared "in capacity or mindset".

He is also involved in many pilot projects that spearhead on research and response. In his article "Q&A: The novel coronavirus outbreak causing COVID-19", Fisher shared his concerns about the emerging virus. For instance, the world's population is completely vulnerable to the novel virus as it is newly emerged in humans, and the current aim of the response muts be to flatten the epidemic curve, by interrupting chains of transmission wherever possible. It was also mentioned that while there were deaths linked to the virus, the greatest concern is the overwhelming of a health system in the wake of excessive transmission.

Fisher is now well known to the media for commentary regarding COVID-19 offered through television, radio, print and social media in dozens of countries of every continent and outlets including CNN, CNBC, BBC, ABC Australia, et cetera. In addition he undertook many webinars and other virtual speaking engagements. His philosophy was that COVID-19 can and must be contained. The key outbreak pillars of case management epidemiology, logistics and risk communication/community engagement are critical at all levels. Isolation of cases that are confirmed early by testing is particularly important in this outbreak.

As in some ways the public face of the response in Singapore, Fisher has featured in a comic series "The COVID Chronicles".
