= Newton hearing =

English legal procedure – judge assesses which party is telling the truth

A Newton hearing or inquiry is a legal procedure in English law originating in the early 1980s, used where the two sides offer such conflicting evidence that a judge sitting alone (that is, without a jury) tries to ascertain which party is telling the truth. It is generally used when a defendant pleads guilty to an offence (as in R v Newton itself), but factual issues (which might have an impact, for example, on the appropriate sentence) need to be resolved between the prosecution and defence.

Allocution is the equivalent in other common law jurisdictions including the United States.

== Origin ==
The name stems from a 1983 case, R v Newton, in which the defendant admitted buggery but claimed his wife had given her consent. The Court of Appeal ruled that, in such cases, there were three ways of resolving the issue. It may be possible to obtain the answer from a jury by directing them to consider whether there is the necessary intent for a specific offence or whether a lesser offence which does not require intent is made out. If that is not possible, then either

- evidence could be heard from both sides and a conclusion reached on the matter which was the root of the problem, or
- no evidence heard but submissions analysed and, where a substantial doubt still persisted, benefit be given to the defendant.

== Procedure and discussion ==
The Newton hearing itself operates like a "mini trial", with a judge rather than a jury deciding the disputed points based upon testimony and submissions. The burden of proof is on the prosecution, who must prove their case beyond reasonable doubt.

For a defendant, there is a balance of risk and benefit to consider. As the Newton hearing takes court time, resources, and perhaps witness testimony, if unsuccessful it will reduce any sentencing credit that might otherwise have been obtained. This aspect has been criticized, on the basis that no such risk exists for the prosecutors, and therefore the Newton hearing could "allow unrealistic, bullying or foolhardy prosecutors to force defendants to choose between having a Newton hearing and playing it safe". In this sense, a Newton hearing may be seen as stacked heavily against a defendant, who must prove the entirety of their concern in order not to suffer from it:

The practice operates as a disincentive to opt for a Newton hearing. Many defence advocates avoid Newton hearings because, unless they are resolved entirely in the defendant's favour, some credit is likely to be lost and it may be that any gains made by the Newton hearing are swallowed up (or worse, outweighed) by the reduction in credit... There is no "remission" for being successful in part, save that the credit for pleading was not reduced further. In the situation where D has required the prosecution to prove its assertions to the criminal standard and the result has been a success and a defeat on each side, why should D be punished, and the prosecution not? Is it not D's right to require such assertions to be proved? The situation appears to be stacked against the defence, to induce acquiescence where arguments may legitimately be taken against the prosecution...

== Notable cases ==
These include:

- R v Newton [1983] Crim LR 198
- R v Ahmed (1985) Crim LR 250, CA
- R v Mirza (1993) 14 Cr App R (S) 64, [1992] Crim LR 600
- R v Odey (1985) Crim LR 55
- R v Mirza (1992) Crim LR 600
- R v Ndikum (2008) The News (Portsmouth)

== Irish law ==
In 2008, James Hamilton, then Director of Public Prosecutions, expressed doubt as to whether a Newton hearing would be compatible with the Constitution of Ireland's guarantee of the right to a jury trial. Nevertheless, such hearings have been held, including in an Anglo Irish Bank trial in 2014, and a trial in the juryless Special Criminal Court in 2017.

== See also ==
- Sentencing in England and Wales
