= St. Andrew's Community Hospital =

Geography
- Location: 8 Simei Street 3, Singapore 529895, Singapore
- Coordinates: 1.3417°N 103.9467°E

Organisation
- Type: Community hospital
- Religious affiliation: Anglican

History
- Opened: 1992; 34 years ago

Links
- Website: www.sach.org.sg
- Lists: Hospitals in Singapore

St. Andrew's Community Hospital (SACH) is a non-profit hospital based in Singapore. It was established in 1992 and runs as a service of St. Andrew's Mission Hospital. It provides intermediate medical care to the patients, primarily focusing on rehabilitation and sub-acute care.

Since 2005, as the hospital is located beside Changi General Hospital (CGH), patients had been transferred from CGH to SACH for rehabilitation and continuing medical care. Medical records and clinical support services, and consultations by visiting CGH specialists are also shared with SACH.

On 18 November 2011, SACH formed the Eastern Health Alliance with Changi General Hospital, SingHealth Polyclinics and The Salvation Army Peacehaven Nursing Home as part of the government direction to provide integrated care instead of episodic treatment.

In Jan 2018, SACH, as part of the Eastern Health Alliance, merged with SingHealth as part of a public health restructuring exercise.
