= Murder of Tran Cam Ny =

2014 murder of a Vietnamese woman in Singapore

Tran Cam Ny
- Born: Tran Cam Ny c. 1982; Vietnam
- Died: 20 November 2014 (aged 32); Ang Mo Kio, Singapore
- Cause of death: Suffocation
- Occupation: KTV hostess
- Known for: Murder victim
- Spouse(s): Unnamed first husband (divorced); Unnamed second husband
- Children: 1 daughter

On 19 November 2014, inside a flat in Ang Mo Kio, a 32-year-old Vietnamese woman named Tran Cam Ny was suffocated to death by her 40-year-old Singaporean boyfriend Jackson Lim Hou Peng (林豪平 Lín Háopíng). Lim, who was previously jailed for drug offenses, was charged with murder after his arrest on the same day of his girlfriend's death. It was revealed that Lim and Tran were at the flat (which belonged to Lim) consuming drugs and as Tran kept making loud sounds, Lim covered her mouth to stop her making any sounds out of fear of attracting the neighbours, suffocating her. Lim was eventually found guilty of manslaughter and drug consumption, sentenced to jail for nine and a half years and given three strokes of the cane.

== Death of Tran Cam Ny ==
On 20 November 2014, police responded to a call for assistance and arrived at a rented flat in Ang Mo Kio, where a 32-year-old woman was found motionless inside the bedroom of the flat's male tenant. The woman, identified as Tran Cam Ny, who was a Vietnamese citizen, was pronounced dead by paramedics at the scene.

On the same day, the tenant, who was described to be a man with heavily tattooed arms, was arrested by the police on suspicion of killing Tran. As the murder happened in a neighborhood mostly populated with the elderly and families, the case brought shock to many residents. According to the suspect's neighbours, the suspect, whom they only knew as "Jack", had always been cordial and never caused trouble, and he always kept a low profile during the many years he lived there. "Jack", whose real name was Jackson Lim Hou Peng, was also noted to have frequented the nearby coffee shop and often drank alone. In recent years, he also would bring various different women (mostly Vietnamese) to his flat.

The fifth of eight siblings, Tran, who first came to Singapore for work in the early 2000s, was married twice to Singaporean men and had one nine-year-old daughter with her first husband, whom she divorced after two years of marriage. Her 20-year-old youngest sister told the press that Tran planned to go back to Vietnam to visit her parents (especially her father who was sick) in a month's time before she died, and the family came to Singapore five days later to recover her body. Tran's death was a shock to her friends, and the Vietnamese community in Singapore also rallied to help her family. Tran had worked as a KTV singer, dancer and hostess before her death, and her funeral was conducted at a Sin Ming Drive parkour, with undertaker Roland Tay making the arrangements free of charge. Her remains were cremated at Mandai Crematorium.

== Murder charge ==
On 22 November 2014, two days after the murder of Tran Cam Ny, 40-year-old Jackson Lim Hou Peng was officially charged with murder in the State Courts of Singapore. If convicted under the Singaporean Penal Code, Lim would receive the death penalty.

After he was charged, Lim was remanded for investigations. He was also scheduled to undergo psychiatric evaluation for three weeks, until 12 December 2014. Subsequently, the remand order was extended by one additional week upon the prosecution's request.

On 19 December 2014, it was revealed in court that Lim was found to be "not of unsound mind" and fit to plead in court, and he was remanded at Central Police Division for further investigations.

== Background of Jackson Lim ==
=== Personal life ===
Jackson Lim Hou Peng
- Born: Jackson Lim Hou Peng; 18 July 1974 (age 52); Singapore
- Other name: Jack
- Occupation: Odd-job labourer (former)
- Status: Released
- Convictions: 1992; Theft (one count); 1997; Unlawful assembly (one count); 2001; Ketamine consumption (one count); 2003; Ketamine trafficking (one count); Norketamine consumption (one count); 2016; Manslaughter (one count); Methamphetamine consumption (one count)
- Criminal charges: 1992; Theft (one count); 1997; Unlawful assembly (one count); 2001; Ketamine consumption (one count); 2003; Ketamine trafficking (one count); Norketamine consumption (one count); 2016; Murder (one count); Methamphetamine consumption (one count); Possession of drug paraphernalia (one count)
- Penalty: 1992; Unknown jail term 1997; Unknown jail term 2001; 12 months' imprisonment 2003; Six years' imprisonment and six strokes of the cane 2016; 9 1/2 years' imprisonment and three strokes of the cane

Jackson Lim Hou Peng was born in Singapore on 18 July 1974. Lim was likely an only child and he had a paternal aunt. Lim's father, who was divorced during his son's childhood, contracted colon cancer and died in October 2015. During his adulthood, Lim was married to a Vietnamese woman but by 2014, both of them became estranged and Lim's wife returned to Vietnam, living separately from him. It was after his separation from his wife that Lim first met his Vietnamese girlfriend, Tran Cam Ny (who was then working as a KTV hostess) on Facebook, and they became romantically involved. They agreed to marry a short time before Tran's murder.

Lim was previously convicted and jailed for various offences from 1992 to 2003. In 1992, Lim was charged and convicted of theft under Section 380 of the Penal Code, and in 1997, Lim was found guilty of being part of an unlawful assembly under Section 143 of the Penal Code, although the length of his imprisonment for these first two crimes were unspecified. On 12 October 2001, Lim was charged with consuming ketamine and jailed for 12 months. On 5 August 2003, Lim was found guilty of ketamine trafficking and norketamine consumption, and sentenced to a total of six years' imprisonment and six strokes of the cane for both offences, including three years for the consumption charge.

=== Lim's confession ===
The following was the official version of the murder of Tran Cam Ny, based on the Lim's confession and evidence gathered by the authorities.

On the night of 19 November 2014, Tran stayed over at Lim's one-room rented flat in Ang Mo Kio and they were joined by two of her friends. Lim started to consume methamphetamine together with Tran. Shortly after, Tran started to argue with Lim over him spending the money that she gave him on other women. Although Lim backed out and entered his bedroom, Tran followed him and argued with him again. It escalated into a physical altercation, in which blows were exchanged between Lim and Tran, and Tran's two friends had to step in to stop the fight.

On the morning of 20 November 2014, the date of the murder, Tran's two friends left, leaving only Tran and Lim inside the flat. Tran, who was still under the influence of drugs, did not stop shouting and Lim slapped her multiple times to stop her from making noise, out of fear of attracting their neighbours' attention, which would cause them to be arrested for drug consumption. Tran continued to shout, driving Lim into using the blanket to cover her mouth and face with both hands. After two attempts of smothering, Lim stopped upon seeing blood flowing out of Tran's mouth, and he later realized that Tran was becoming unresponsive and motionless.

After realizing that Tran was no longer responsive, Lim tried multiple times to resuscitate her and he also called his father and friend for help before calling for an ambulance. The call operator instructed Lim step by step on how to revive Tran. After paramedics arrived at the scene, Tran was pronounced dead. Lim was later arrested that day.

Dr Paul Chui, a forensic pathologist, certified that Tran died as a result of suffocation. Tran also tested positive for drugs, as did Lim.

== Trial and sentencing ==
On 14 March 2016, Jackson Lim Hou Peng officially stood trial at the High Court for killing Tran Cam Ny. By then, Lim's murder charge was reduced to a lesser offence of culpable homicide not amounting to murder, also known as manslaughter in Singaporean law, and the reduction of the charge allowed Lim to escape the death penalty. As the manslaughter charge was brought forward under Section 304(b) of the Penal Code, which dictates an offence of manslaughter committed without an intention to cause death, Lim faced a jail term of up to ten years' imprisonment with a possible fine or caning.

At the start of his trial, Lim pleaded guilty to the manslaughter charge, and to one count of methamphetamine consumption under the Misuse of Drugs Act, which carries a possible sentence of between five and seven years in jail and caning of between three and six strokes. A third charge of possessing drug utensils for consumption was also allowed to be taken into consideration during sentencing. During the trial, Lim was represented by defence lawyer Jennifer Lim, while the prosecution was led by both Lee Zu Zhao and Eugene Lee, and the trial was presided over by veteran High Court judge Tay Yong Kwang.

The prosecution proposed an aggregate sentence of not less than 11 years' imprisonment and three strokes of the cane, which consisted of the minimum sentence of five years and three strokes for the drug charge and six years for the manslaughter charge. They argued that although the victim was shouting and acting hysterically, there was no provocation from her and she did not pose a threat to the accused; an aggravating factor was Lim trying to keep Tran silent by covering her mouth. On the other hand, they also accepted that the case was not as aggravating as some precedent cases of manslaughter due to the presence of mitigating factors.

In mitigation, Lim's defence counsel asked for leniency. Lim's lawyer Jennifer Lim argued that her client had shown genuine contrition and remorse for causing the death of his girlfriend, whom he loved dearly and wanted to marry, and there was no intention to kill Tran. The defence also stated that Lim only wanted to calm Tran down throughout their quarrel and Tran's uncontrollable screaming and shouting while under the effects of drugs. The defence argued that he only covered of Tran's mouth for her own good and to not get them into legal trouble, and this resulted in Tran's accidental death. Therefore, the defence argued for a jail term of three to four years on the charge of manslaughter. They did not object to the prosecution's proposed sentence of five years' jail with three strokes of the cane for the drug charge. Lim's lawyer also cited that Lim's parental aunt and her family continued to visit Lim while he was behind bars, and they were willing to provide him familial support after his release. She added that Lim's father died before his trial, and thus proposed for the court to exercise its mercy during sentencing.

On the same date, Justice Tay Yong Kwang delivered his verdict. The judge noted that the prosecution and defence concurred on the sentence for drug use and agreed with both sides on the proposed sentence, and thus focused his judgement on the sentence for manslaughter. Justice Tay accepted that in terms of height and build, Lim possessed undue advantage over the victim, but he also accepted that Lim did not harbour any intention to hurt Tran. He observed that the couple were happily consuming drugs up until Tran's erratic behaviour, and Lim unintentionally killed the girlfriend whom he loved dearly and wanted to marry. He also found Lim to be truly remorseful of killing Tran, based on Lim's immediate response of rendering assistance for Tran upon finding her unresponsive. On this basis, Justice Tay agreed that the sentence should carry some degree of leniency in view of the aggravating and extenuating circumstances of the case.

Justice Tay sentenced Lim to jail for four years and six months on one count of manslaughter, and a jail term of five years with three strokes of the cane for the charge of drug consumption. Additionally, Justice Tay ordered the two prison terms to run consecutively and commence from the date of Lim's arrest. In total, 41-year-old Jackson Lim Hou Peng was sentenced to 9 1/2 years' imprisonment and three strokes of the cane. In his sentencing remarks, Justice Tay highlighted that Tran's death was a tragic one and it demonstrated the tragic consequences of drug consumption. He personally addressed Lim in court, telling him not to take drugs again after his release from prison.

According to a friend of Tran, who gave his surname as Chew, Tran's family was still saddened over her death, and he himself felt the jail term of nine and a half years was inadequate. He felt that Lim deserved the maximum sentence of life imprisonment for causing Tran's death. Chew also felt that it was doubtful that Lim and Tran would want to marry each other, alleging that Tran did not like how Lim treated her and their relationship was more of a "fling".

== Aftermath ==
In the aftermath of Jackson Lim's conviction and imprisonment, the death of Tran Cam Ny was re-enacted in the Singaporean Chinese-language crime show The Convict, in which Lim and Tran's names were changed to protect their privacy. Lim's was portrayed by Singaporean actor Benjamin Heng while Tran was portrayed by Singaporean actress Charmaine Sei.

Lim, who served his sentence at Changi Prison, has since been released from prison.

== See also ==
- Caning in Singapore
- List of major crimes in Singapore
