= Prevention of Human Trafficking Act 2015 =

Prevention of Human Trafficking Act 2014 (or 2015)
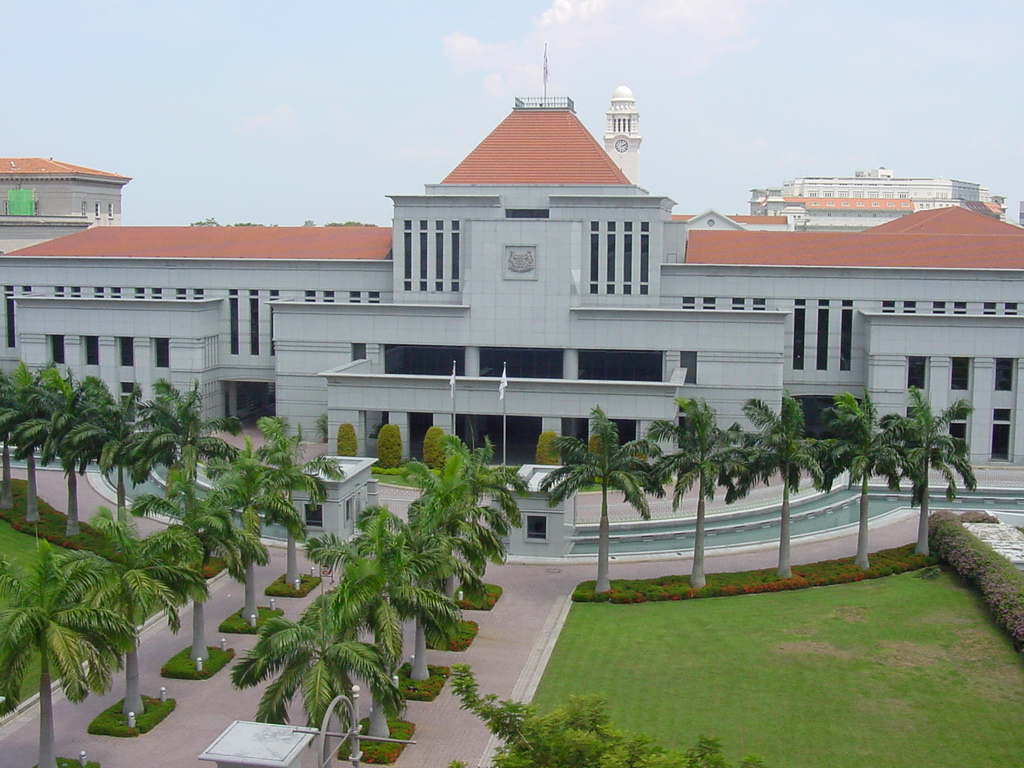

Parliament of Singapore
- Long title: An Act to deter and punish trafficking in persons and to protect and assist trafficked persons, and to make consequential amendments to the Children and Young Persons Act (Chapter 38 of the 2001 Revised Edition).
- Enacted by: Parliament of Singapore
- Enacted: 3 November 2014
- Assented to: 12 December 2014
- Commenced: 1 March 2015
- Status: In force

The Prevention of Human Trafficking Act 2015 (PHTA) is a statute of the Parliament of Singapore that criminalizes Trafficking-In-Persons (TIP) especially vulnerable individuals. The law is designed specifically to make acts of knowingly receiving payment in connection with the exploitation of a trafficked victim a criminal offence.

== Overview ==
Objective

The Prevention of Human Trafficking Act 2015, in Singapore, aims to stop all forms of human trafficking and punish the perpetrators. This act focuses on protecting people from being forced into work, sex trade, or organ trade through threats, lies, or abuse. The law also ensures that victims are treated with care and not as criminals. It provides support, such as shelter, medical assistance, and legal aid, to help victims recover. The Act applies to both local and foreign offenders and it also covers crimes committed overseas by Singapore citizens or permanent residents.

Explanation

The PHTA is an Act to deter trafficking-in-persons and supports the rehabilitation of trafficked victims, especially vulnerable individuals. The PHTA firstly provides enforcement of severe penalties that criminalizes any individual that receives monetary compensation that arises from the exploitation of a victim that is trafficked, especially women and children.

The PHTA also caters for the well-being of trafficked victims and encourages the reporting of trafficking or suspected trafficking activity.

Scope of punishment

Section 4,5,6 and 9 explain the scope of punishment in this act.

Section 4(1): Under this Act, anyone found guilty of recruiting, harbouring or conveying a child below the age of 18 for the purpose of exploitation, whether abroad or not, is liable to a maximum penalty of imprisonment of up to 10 years, a fine of up to $100,000 and caning of up to six strokes.

== Uses of the Act ==
With the launch of the Integrated Resorts of Singapore, vice activities are taking place within the red-light districts of Geylang and even happening outside of the red-light districts. The PHTA caters for law enforcement agencies in going after syndicated crimes, keeping vice syndicates not immune from the law if they do not apply for a licence. The launch of the PHTA also saw the formation of project X a community-based organisation with programmes for sex workers that recorded more than 50 reports of abuse where consenting sex workers may be trafficked.

Within a year of the Act's commencement, 25-year-old Muhammad Khairulanwar bin Rohmat, a final-year student from Singapore Institute of Management, was convicted under the Prevention of Human Trafficking Act and sentenced to a total of 6 years and 3 months' imprisonment and fined $30,000 for recruiting two underage girls between 15 and 16 years of age for sexual exploitation and lure them into prostitution. Khairulanwar admitted to 4 out of 18 charges – 3 under the Act for recruiting a child under the age of 18 for sexual exploitation and receiving payment from the exploitation of one of these underage girls, and one under the Penal Code for sexual penetration of a minor under 16 years of age with consent – against him; the other 14 charges – involving Khairulanwar's trafficking of 7 other girls for prostitution and receiving payment from the earnings of his victims – were taken into consideration during sentencing. Muhammad Khairulanwar bin Rohmat was the first person to be tried and convicted under the Prevention of Human Trafficking Act.

As a consequence of this Act, by 2016, the Government of Singapore also ratified the United Nations Protocol to Prevent, Suppress and Punish Trafficking in Persons, Especially Women and Children, known as the Asean Convention against Trafficking in Persons, Especially Women and Children (ACTIP), at the 27th ASEAN Summit.
