= Lau Teik Oon =

Lau Teik Oon was Archdeacon of Singapore from 1967 to 1976.

He was ordained in 1956 for the Diocese of Singapore and later became Vicar of St John, Jurong. He was an Honorary Canon of St Andrew's Cathedral, Singapore from 1965.

He died on 28 July 2011.
