= Toa Payoh Hospital =

Geography
- Location: 42 Toa Payoh Rise, Toa Payoh, Singapore 298102
- Coordinates: 01°20′13″N 103°50′30″E

Organisation
- Type: District General
- Affiliated university: School of Nursing for Pupil Assistant Nurse

Services
- Emergency department: Accident & Emergency

History
- Founded: 20 May 1959; 66 years ago
- Closed: 15 February 1997; 29 years ago

Toa Payoh Hospital (Chinese Simplified:大巴窑医院) was a hospital located in Toa Payoh, Singapore. The hospital started operations as Thomson Road Hospital on 20 May 1959 and in 1997 merged with Changi Hospital to form Changi General Hospital located in Simei. The premises of the hospital was supposed to be taken over by Ren Ci Community Hospital but was eventually demolished.

== History ==
To meet the growing demand for medical services, the Singapore government decided to build a new hospital for the chronic sick at Thomson Road, named Thomson Road Hospital. Established on 20 May 1959, physicians practicing in Singapore and overseas received their postgraduate clinical training in the hospital. The hospital cost S$4.1 million to be built and it was opened by then-Minister of Health A. J. Braga.

Nursing training was also formalised when the School of Nursing for Pupil Assistant Nurse was officially opened within Thomson Road Hospital in September 1965.

In the 1960s, the patient load gradually increased and new facilities, such as a surgical block and an X-ray department, were added. The hospital also started offering neurosurgery in 1965 and obstetrics and gynaecology in 1969. It was renamed Thomson General Hospital in September 1965. During the 1970s, the hospital introduced new clinical specialties, which included neonatology and orthopaedic surgery. The Department of Anaesthesia was also formally established in 1971. The hospital was then renamed Toa Payoh Hospital named after the town of the hospital was serving.

In the 1980s, the current facilities of the hospital were unable to cope with increasing numbers of patients from the surrounding estates, including Toa Payoh, Ang Mo Kio, Yishun, Serangoon and Bishan. The management of the hospital then decided to move to a bigger site to increase its bed capacity.

The hospital was restructured on 1 April 1990 and had also created new programmes to improve services and care. More medical services were provided with the introduction of the ENT department in 1994 and the Eye department in 1996. Within a year, it had become the second busiest in Singapore. However, though the efforts to improve the services and care, the hospital's patient load increased to maximum capacity in mid-1990s. The hospital faced a shortage of beds and eventually closed on 15 February 1997. Hospital operations were moved to Simei as New Changi Hospital, as part of a merger with Changi Hospital.
