= Changi General Hospital =

Hospital in Simei, Singapore

Changi General Hospital 樟宜综合医院 Hospital Besar Changi
- SingHealth
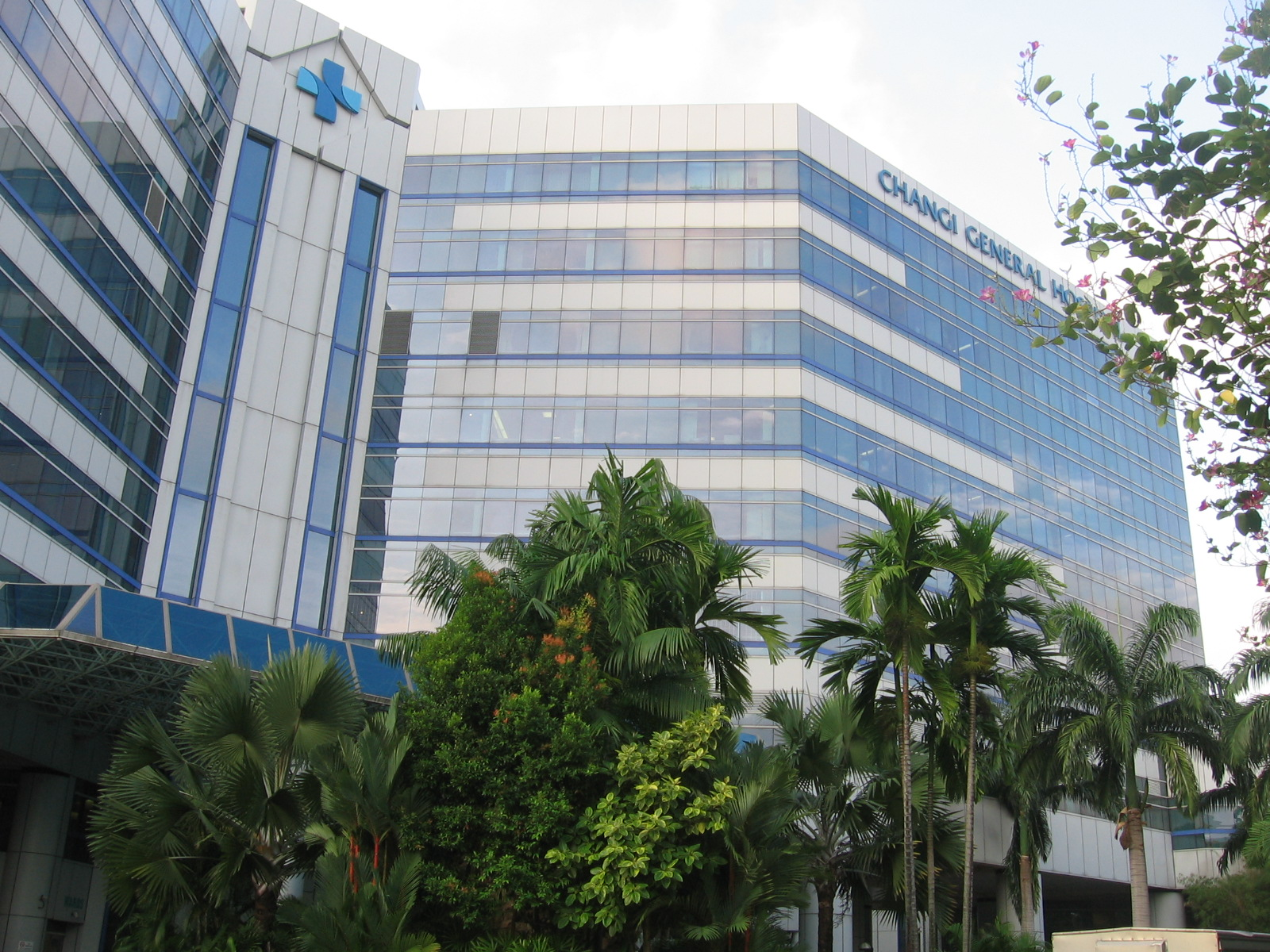
- Changi General Hospital

Geography
- Location: 2 Simei Street 3, Singapore 529889, Singapore
- Coordinates: 1°20′26.0″N 103°56′57.0″E

Organisation
- Funding: Public hospital
- Type: District General

Services
- Emergency department: Yes Accident & Emergency
- Beds: 1000

History
- Opened: 28 March 1998; 27 years ago

Links
- Website: www.cgh.com.sg
- Lists: Hospitals in Singapore

Changi General Hospital (abbreviation: CGH) is a 1000-bed large district general hospital located in Simei, eastern Singapore. It is Singapore's first purpose-built general hospital to serve communities in the east and north-east regions.

The hospital has more than 23 medical services, from general surgery, internal medicine, cardiology, ENT to orthopaedic surgery and sports medicine. It houses six specialist centres – Breast Centre, Changi Sports Medicine Centre, Diabetes Centre, Geriatric Centre, Integrated Sleep Service and Medical Centre for International Travellers.

== History ==
On 15 February 1997, the Old Changi Hospital merged with Toa Payoh Hospital to form New Changi Hospital and began to move into the present premises. The hospital was declared officially opened on 28 March 1998 by then Deputy Prime Minister Lee Hsien Loong. Under Singapore's public healthcare restructuring, the hospital became part of the Singapore Health Services (SingHealth) cluster in 2000.

Over the years, the hospital expanded its clinical services to include Sports Medicine, Dermatology, Psychological Medicine, Rheumatology and Neurosurgery, and introduced specialist centres.

On 11 April 2005, the Changi General Hospital became the first acute care hospital to integrate care with a community hospital, St. Andrew's Community Hospital. Both hospitals are connected by a sheltered link bridge. On 11 June 2005, the hospital was the second hospital in Singapore to receive the Joint Commission International (JCI) accreditation. It was the first hospital to have a JCI accreditation for its Heart Failure Programme and Acute Myocardial Infarction Programme.

To build on its expertise in sports medicine and create capacity for more sports specialists, the hospital acquired Singapore Sports Medicine Centre on 1 November 2010.

On 1 April 2011, the hospital became legally independent of SingHealth.

On 18 November 2011, the hospital became a founding member of the Eastern Health Alliance. The Eastern Health Alliance was officially launched on 18 November 2011 by founding members Changi General Hospital, St. Andrew's Community Hospital, SingHealth Polyclinics and The Salvation Army Peacehaven Nursing Home. Its stated intention was to more closely coordinate the provision of healthcare services in the East.

In 2017, the Eastern Health Alliance merged with SingHealth and the hospital returned to the governance of SingHealth.
