= Beach Station Bus Terminal =

Bus terminal in Southern Islands, Singapore

Beach Station Bus Terminal 海滩站巴士终站 Terminal Bas Stesen Pantai
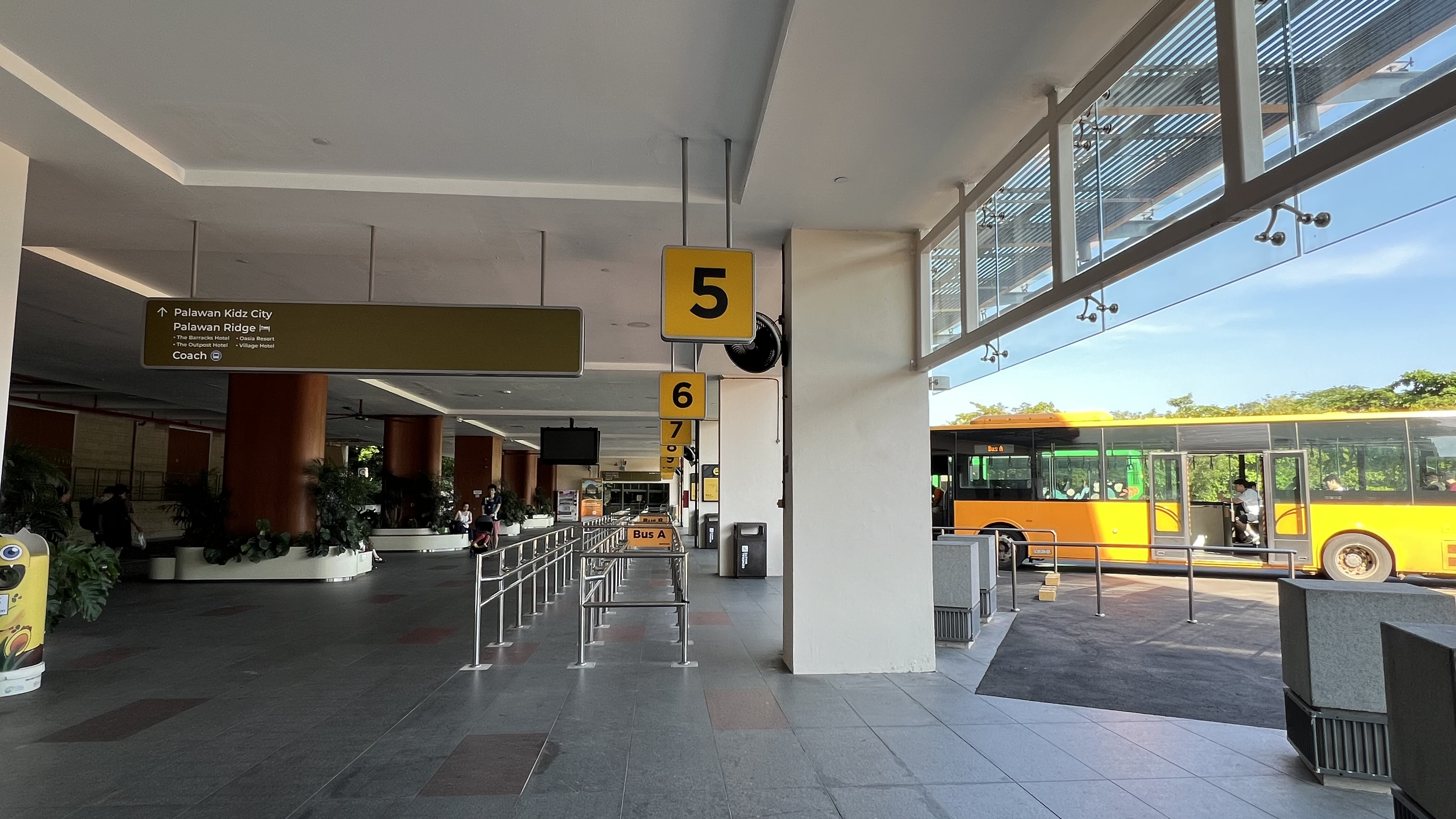
- Interior of Beach Station Bus Terminal.

General information
- Location: 50 Siloso Beach Walk, Singapore 884011
- Coordinates: 1°15′5″N 103°49′7″E
- System: Public Bus Terminal
- Owner: Sentosa Development Corporation
- Operator: Sentosa Development Corporation
- Bus routes: 4 (Sentosa Development Corporation); 1 (SBS Transit)
- Bus stands: 13 End-on berths (Inclusive of 2 Wheelchair-Accessible Berths)
- Bus operators: ComfortDelGro; SBS Transit; Tower Transit Singapore
- Connections: Beach Station (Sentosa Express)

Construction
- Structure type: At-grade
- Parking: Yes (Beach Station)
- Accessible: Accessible alighting/boarding points Accessible public toilets Graduated kerb edges Tactile guidance system

History
- Opened: 15 January 2007; 19 years ago

Key dates
- 15 January 2007: Commenced operations
Location

Beach Station Bus Terminal (also known as Beach Station Transfer Hub) is a bus terminal located in Sentosa Island, Singapore. It is located beside its namesake monorail station, Beach Station on the Sentosa Express, and under the Sentosa Express Monorail Depot, which serves as the upper floor. The terminal serves as a vital transportation node for both residents and visitors, providing access to various attractions, hotels, and residential areas on Sentosa Island.

== History ==
Plans for Beach Station Bus Terminal first originated in the early development of Sentosa as a leisure destination. In the 1970s, the Singapore government planned to transform the island into a major tourist attraction. As part of this effort, Sentosa Development Corporation (SDC) was established in 1972 to oversee the development and management of Sentosa.

Over the years, as Sentosa gained popularity and experienced an increase in tourist arrivals, the demand for transportation services grew. To cope with increasing number of visitors, the Sentosa Monorail commenced operations in 1987, but later in the 2000s, due to increasing cost of maintenance and bad service, it ceased operations. Later, to cope with the evolving needs of visitors, the Sentosa Express was opened on 15 January 2007 and Beach Station Bus Terminal opened in tandem with it.

== Bus services ==
=== Sentosa Bus Reorganisation ===
Originally, Beach Station Bus Terminal was served by internal bus services such as Sentosa Buses 1 and 2, which served Siloso Point and Resorts World Sentosa, and Sentosa Bus 3, which served Sentosa Cove and Sofitel Singapore Sentosa Resort & Spa. However, as part of the Sentosa Bus Reorganisation, Sentosa Buses 1 was replaced with Sentosa Bus A, while Sentosa Bus 3 was replaced with Sentosa Bus B, plying the same route but not serving Sofitel Singapore Sentosa Resort & Spa. Sentosa Buses 1, 2 and 3 ceased operations on 29 July 2017, and Buses A and B commenced operations on the following day. Sentosa Bus C, which has a route identical to Sentosa Bus 2, commenced operations on 1 October 2019

On 30 July 2017, trunk route bus service 123 was extended to Beach Station Bus Terminal. It is the first and currently the only mainland trunk route serving Sentosa.

On 1 January 2024, Sentosa Bus C was discontinued. Its last day of service was on 31 December 2023.

=== Takeover by Tower Transit ===
On 29 May 2025, Tower Transit Singapore was awarded a contract by Sentosa Development Corporation (SDC) to operate eight bus services, including 5 employee & 3 public bus services on Sentosa Island, with a base 5-year term. This marks Tower Transit’s entry into private bus operations. Tower Transit’s will begin bus operations & maintenance of Employee Bus Services & Services A, B, D for 1 October 2025, while takeover of Sentosa Beach Tram will commence on 1 January 2026.

=== List of bus routes ===
Beach Station Bus Terminal operates under Sentosa Development Corporation (SDC), also working closely with the LTA to ensure seamless connectivity and accessibility to and from the terminal. Sentosa Internal Bus Services A, B, D operate under Tower Transit Singapore while the Sentosa Beach Shuttle (tram) operate under ComfortDelGro, whearas Bus Service 123 is under Bukit Merah Bus Package, which is overseen by SBS Transit.

Operator	Package	Routes
ComfortDelGro	Nil	Sentosa Beach Shuttle (tram)
SBS Transit	Bukit Merah	123
Tower Transit Singapore	Nil	Bus A, Bus B, Bus D
