= Pulau Brani =

Island in Singapore

Name transcription(s)
  - Chinese: 布拉尼岛
  - Pinyin: Bùlānídǎo
  - Malay: Pulau Brani
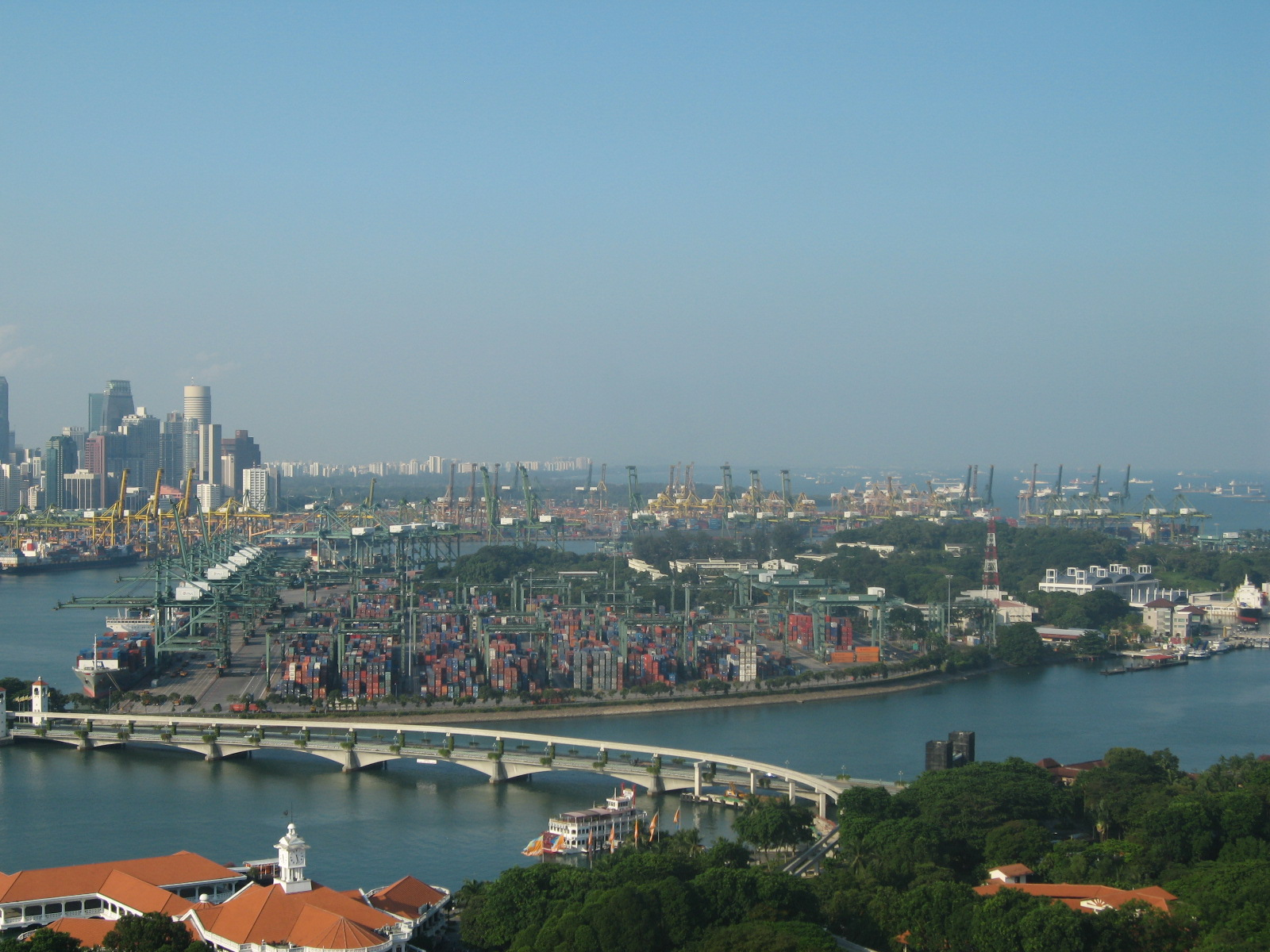
- Pulau Brani lies to the right of the Keppel Harbour, as seen in this view from Sentosa's Tiger Sky Tower

- Location of Pulau Brani within Singapore
- Coordinates: 1°15′36″N 103°50′00″E
- Country: Singapore

Pulau Brani is an island located off the southern coast of Singapore, near Keppel Harbour. The island is situated between the main island of Singapore and the resort island of Sentosa, and is linked to the mainland via Brani Terminal Avenue. The area of Pulau Brani is 1.22 square kilometres (0.47 square miles). The island was previously home for Orang Laut, and in Malay, the meaning of Pulau Brani is “isle of the brave”.

== History ==
=== Pre-independence ===
The bulk of the island was occupied by the Malayan Command Ordnance Depot until 1937, when a new purpose-built depot was constructed at Alexandra on the mainland.

The Straits Trading Co. built a tin smelting factory on Pulau Brani in 1890 to process the tin ores mined in mainland Malaya. The factory was on the island for more than 70 years before it had to move out to make way for the Brani Naval Base in the late 1960s.

The British army had its maritime (water transport) base on the island, first with the RASC and then the RCT. Many families lived in the married quarters on the island. Primary children attended the British army school located near Buller Jetty, as did the children from army families on Blakang Mati (now Sentosa). Secondary age children had to go to the mainland by ferry, attending the Alexandra Schools at Gillman Barracks, then after 1964 either Bourne (in the Gillman buildings) or the then new St John's Comprehensive at what is now the United World College at Dover Road.

=== Post-independence ===
After Singapore's independence, Brani Naval Base was built on the island. In the year 2000, the base was relocated out of Pulau Brani to Changi and Tuas. The Police Coast Guard (PCG) took over the former site of the naval base in 2006, forming it into today's PCG Brani Regional Base. The rest of Pulau Brani was developed into the Brani Container Terminal.

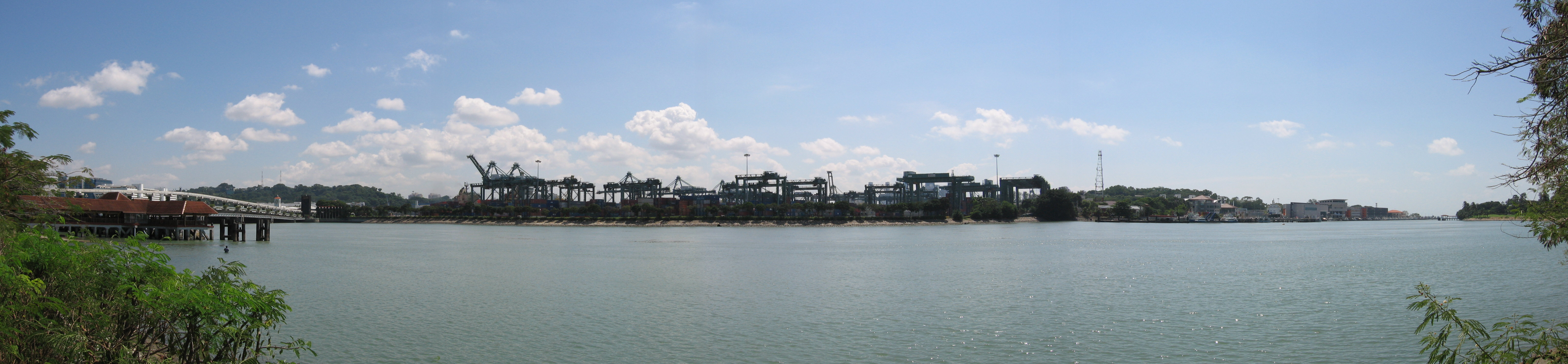
Panoramic view of Pulau Brani with Selat Sengkir (Sengkir Straits) in the foreground. Taken from Sentosa near the Visitor Arrival Centre.

== Redevelopment plans ==
In 2019, then Prime Minister Lee Hsien Loong announced plans to redevelop Pulau Brani into a new tourist destination. Development will start after port operations on the island are relocated to Tuas Megaport, scheduled to be completed by 2027. In October 2025, the Sentosa Development Corporation began studying the possibility of implementing a people mover system connecting the island to the mainland, similar to the Sentosa Express to Sentosa.

== Popular culture ==
Pulau Brani is featured in the 2021 video game Battlefield 2042 as the setting of multiplayer map Manifest.
