= Sentosa Monorail =

Former monorail system in Singapore

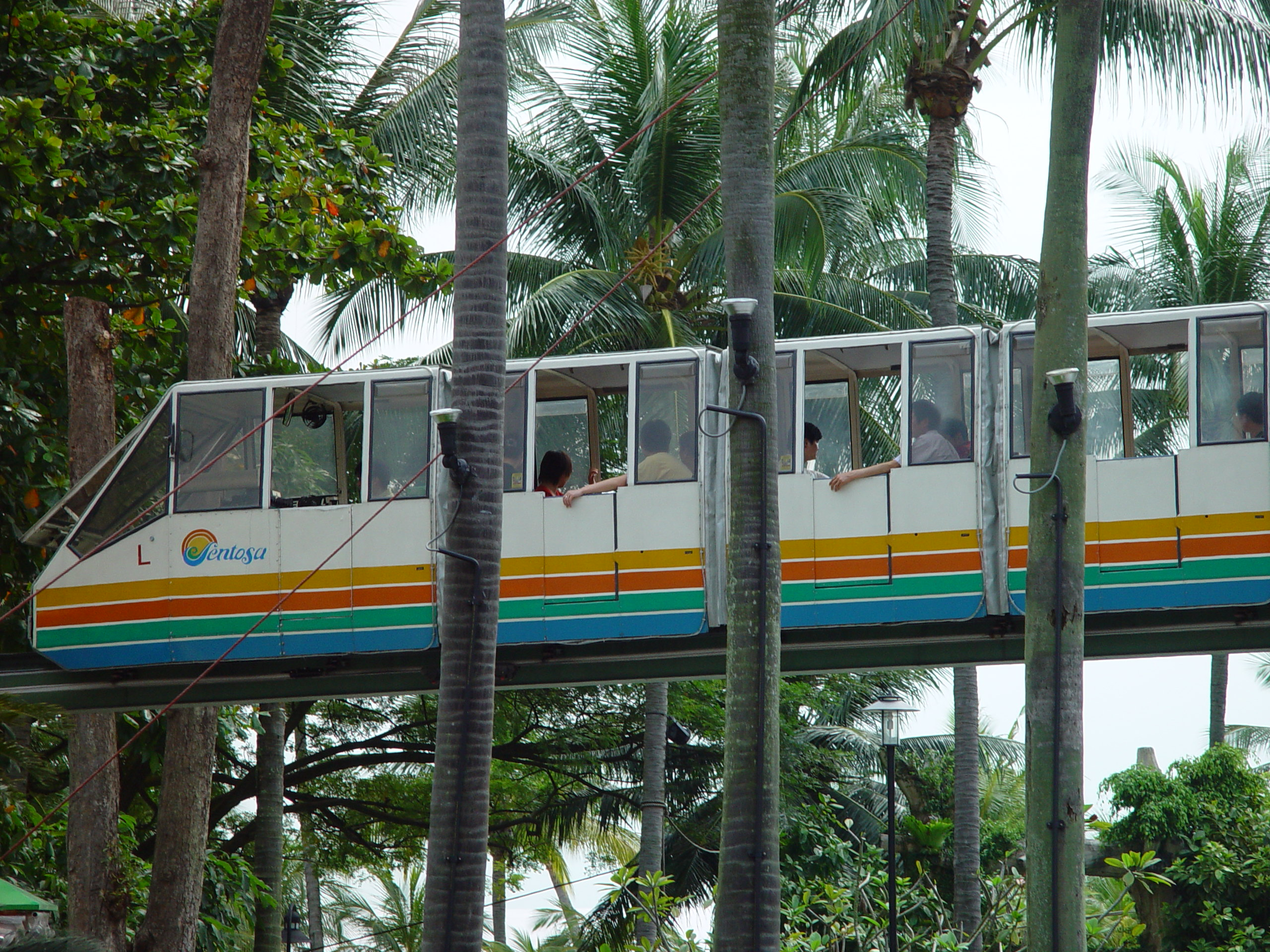

Overview
- Locale: Sentosa, Singapore
- Transit type: Straddle-beam monorail
- Number of lines: 1
- Number of stations: 7

Operation
- Began operation: 23 February 1982; 44 years ago
- Ended operation: 16 March 2005; 21 years ago
- Operator: Sentosa Development Corporation
- Number of vehicles: 16 trains

Technical
- System length: 3.6 mi (5.8 km)

The Sentosa Monorail was a monorail system which served as the main means of transportation on the island of Sentosa in Singapore, and has been replaced by the new monorail system, the Sentosa Express. The system was constructed at a cost of S$14 million by Swiss corporation Von Roll, which also built the Singapore Cable Car.

Commencing operations on 23 February 1982, the line initially opened with only five stations, running in a clockwise loop. In 1987, the Ferry Terminal Monorail Station began operations when the Sentosa Ferry Terminal opened that year. In 1991, the line changed to an anti-clockwise direction after the Underwater World Monorail Station commenced operations, when Underwater World opened that year. It operated several 16-car, non-air conditioned trains in a unidirectional anti-clockwise single loop through seven stations located around the western half of the island. The monorail rides were initially charged at S$3 for adults and S$1.50 for children. The trip was later made free for passengers, who could ride the system as often as they wished throughout their stay on the island. Four of the stations have two platforms; for such stations, the Spanish solution was implemented, where passengers alight at one platform and board at the opposite platform.

== History ==
=== Background ===
Plans for the monorail were first announced in June 1979 by the Sentosa Development Corporation (SDC) to replace the double-decker buses that were used as transport around Sentosa. The route included seven stations near the Sentosa Ferry Terminal, Maritime Museum, the Apollo Hotel, the Coralarium, swimming lagoon, cable car station and the surrender chamber, and Fort Siloso. The SDC did consider implementing a monorail system earlier but chose not to due to the high costs of the previous design. It was estimated to cost S$12 million (1979) (US$5.52 million) and take 18 months to construct it, with the system planned to use 6 monorail carriages. According to an SDC spokesman, the monorail system was the "most appropriate choice" of transport when the SDC was choosing what type of transport to choose, which included electric cars and trailer buses. However, it criticised by a nature lover writing to the New Nation in December, where they wrote that building the monorail would disrupt the peace of the island and the monorail itself would be a "gimmick". The SDC responded to the letter a month later, assuring that the monorail would be "as quiet and pollution free as possible" and not a "gimmick".

=== Construction and opening ===
External media
- Artist's impression of the Sentosa Monorail Source: The Straits Times
- Advertisement of United Engineers congratulating Habegger Thun Source: The Straits Times
- The Sentosa Monorail under construction Source: The Straits Times

In February 1980, it was announced that the contract for the design and the installation of the monorail would be awarded to Swiss company Habegger Thun, with the SDC hosting a signing ceremony between the two corporations at its headquarters. Habegger Thun proposed a similar route to SDC's route though it omitted the Coralarium station. It was also announced that United Engineers Pte Ltd would be the main subcontractor and carry out structural and civil engineering works. The cost of the monorail was estimated to be S$10.5 million (1980) (US$4.9 million) and it was expected for the construction period to be 20 months.

Site surveys commenced in the same month, with piling works expected to start in the middle of March. However, the ceremony was held in July, with the chairman of the SDC driving the first borehole of the monorail. In October, they started laying the rails and the columns of the system, with expected completion by next September and 391 metres (428 yd) of rails being laid by December. The number of monorail carriages have also been increased from 6 to 9. By January 1981, 30% of the piling works have been completed, with about 550 metres (600 yd) of track laid out. There have been five confirmed stations by that time, being the Maritime Museum, the Apollo Hotel, the swimming lagoon, the cable car station and Fort Siloso, with Fort Siloso itself temporarily closed until February for piling works. However, the Ferry Terminal station has not been finalised yet. By June, it was expected for the monorail to be ready by December.By July, 3 kilometres (1.9 mi) of track was laid. In November, it was the expected completion date was March of next year. In the same month, the cost of the system rose to S$13 million (1981) (US$6.15 million). By December, the cost of the monorail grew to S$16 million (1981) (US$7.57 million).

Initially expected to be completed in April 1982, it was completed two months before schedule at a cost of S$16 million, and opened on 23 February 1982. Four intermediate stations along the line at several locations around the island were opened on 1 December the same year. This resulted in the bus service to these locations being terminated, and the monorail thus became the main mode of transport around the island. As a result of the monorail's opening, as well as the opening of several other attractions, the number of visitors to Sentosa also shot up, increasing to 1,067,192 visitors from 567,567 visitors over the same period in the previous year.

=== Closure ===
Due to the rapid modernisation of the island, maintenance problems, increasing costs, and declining popularity as visitors started complaining that the ride was slow and uncomfortable, the Sentosa Monorail ceased operations on 16 March 2005 to make way for the new four-station Sentosa Express monorail. Much of the track and all of the rolling stock were sold as scrap for S$350,000. A subsequent assessment showed that some of the butt welds did not match the specification of British Standards. Parts of the track and some of the monorail stations were repurposed for other uses, such as the "Surrender Chamber" at Fort Siloso, a restaurant being developed at the Central Beach, and the SDC Office was rebuilt and converted into a bar. Gateway was demolished when the line closed and Ferry Terminal was demolished in March 2007 to make way for Resorts World Sentosa.

== Stations ==
Map of route and stations

There were no terminal stations for Sentosa Monorail.

List of stations:

Station name	Station number	Opened	Closed	Status				
Station name	Ferry Terminal	Opened	Closed	Status	1	1987	2005	Demolished in March 2007
Station name	Underwater World	2	1991	2005	Demolished in 2017			
Fort Siloso	3	1982	2005	Subsequently repurposed				
Cable Car	4	1982	2005	Subsequently repurposed				
Central Beach	5	1982	2005	Demolished in 2022				
Golf Club	6	1982	2005	Demolished in 2022				
Causeway	7	1982	2005	Demolished in 2005				
