= Sentosa Cove =

Residential enclave in Singapore

Coordinates: 1°14′55.46″N 103°50′36.13″E

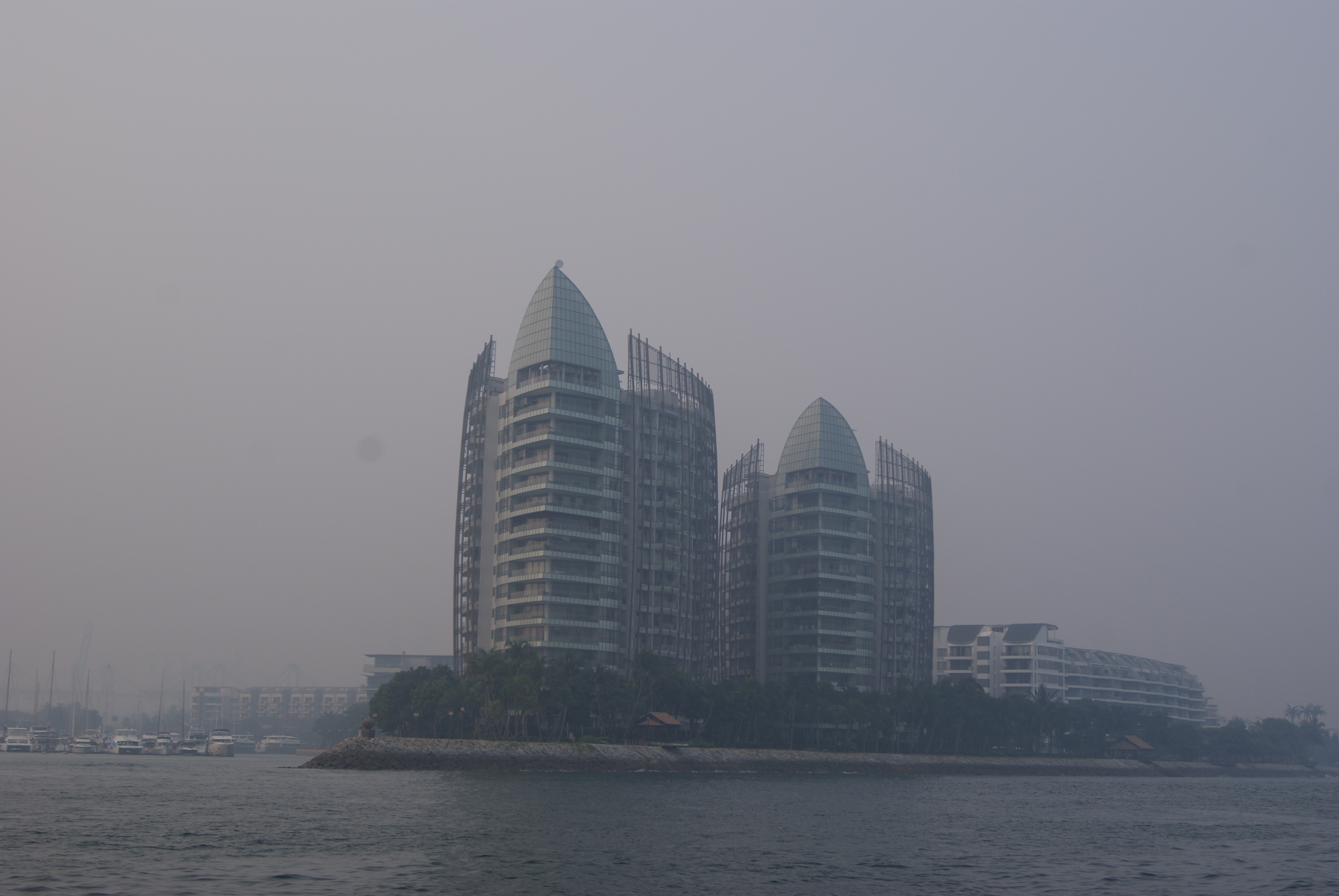
View of Oceanfront@Sentosa Cove on a hazy evening

Sentosa Cove is a residential enclave in the eastern part of Sentosa Island in Singapore, which is planned to include about 2,500 units when fully expanded. It is largely made up of reclaimed land. The master developer of the site was Sentosa Cove Pte. Ltd., a subsidiary of Sentosa Development Corporation, which purchased the site from the Singapore Land Authority for about S$800 million.

About 60% of property buyers in Sentosa Cove are foreigners. It is the only place in Singapore where foreigners are allowed to purchase landed homes. All residential properties in Sentosa Cove are leasehold titles subject to a 99-year lease.

== Attractions ==
There are multiple attractions found in the Sentosa Cove enclave, including hotels and F&B outlets.

=== Hotels ===
- ONE°15 Marina Sentosa Cove, Singapore - A boutique 26-room hotel situated by the marina at Sentosa Cove. It is also a members' club and is the point of contact for berthing at the Sentosa Cove marina.
- W. Singapore, Sentosa Cove - A 240-room five-star luxury resort hotel known for providing a variety of services & facilities including the Whatever/Whenever service. The property is connected to a 228-unit residential complex (W. Residences) located at Quayside Isle.

=== Spas ===
- Spa Rael - Situated within ONE°15 Marina Sentosa Cove
- AWAY Spa - Situated within W. Singapore

=== Food & Beverages ===
There is a wide variety of food and beverage options available at Sentosa Cove, notably along Quayside Isle, the enclave's upscale waterfront shopping centre. This includes:

- Boaters' Bar
- Blue Lotus - Chinese Eating House
- Gin Khao Bistro
- Greenwood Fish Market
- Joe & The Juice
- Miska Cafe
- Mykonos on the Bay
- Rock Bar - Burger & Steakhouse
- Sabio by the Sea - Tapas Bar & Grill
- SolePomodoro Trattoria Pizzeria
- Two Chefs Bar
- WOK°15 Kitchen, situated within ONE°15 Marina Sentosa Cove
