= Sentosa Development Corporation =

Statutory board under the Ministry of Trade and Industry of Singapore

Agency overview
- Formed: 1 September 1972; 54 years ago
- Jurisdiction: Government of Singapore
- Headquarters: 39 Artillery Avenue, Sentosa, Singapore 099958
- Agency executives: Bob Tan, Chairman; Thien Kwee Eng, CEO
- Parent agency: Ministry of Energy, Trade and Industry
- Website: www.sentosa.gov.sg
- Agency ID: T08GB0048K

Sentosa Development Corporation (SDC) is a statutory board under the Ministry of Energy, Trade and Industry of the Government of Singapore.

== Purpose ==
=== Islands ===
The Sentosa Development Corporation (SDC) was formed on 1 September 1972. Its main task is to oversee the development, management and promotion of the island resort, Sentosa Island.

=== Subsidiaries ===
SDC is in charge of the following three subsidiary companies:

1. Sentosa Leisure Management (SLM) oversees the day-to-day operations of Sentosa.
2. Sentosa Cove Resort Management (SCRM) is the place manager for Sentosa Cove, a residential and commercial district on the island's waterfront.
3. Mount Faber Leisure Group (MFLG) operates Singapore's sole cableway system and offers lifestyle merchandise as well as F&B dining on the hill at Faber Peak (formerly the Jewel Box).

=== Registered Society ===
1. Sentosa Golf Club (SGC) manages two award-winning 18-holes, par-72 championship golf courses on the island - The Serapong, which is ranked 58th in the World’s 100 Greatest Golf Courses by Golf Digest, and The Tanjong.

=== Monorail ===
SDC owns the Sentosa Express, a S$140 million light rail system that provides easy access into Sentosa from VivoCity.

The old SDC office at Allanbrooke Road was once served by the Sentosa Monorail which ceased operations on 16 March 2005. The new SDC office is currently based at Artillery Avenue.

== See also ==
- Sentosa Island
- Sentosa Cove
- Statutory boards of the Singapore Government
