= BraviSEAmo! =

Former water show at Tokyo DisneySea

Tokyo DisneySea
- Area: Mediterranean Harbor
- Status: Removed
- Soft opening date: July 16, 2004
- Opening date: July 17, 2004
- Closing date: November 13, 2010
- Replaced: DisneySea Symphony
- Replaced by: Fantasmic!

Ride statistics
- Attraction type: Multimedia show
- Designer: Yves Pépin; Oriental Land Company; Walt Disney Creative Entertainment

BraviSEAmo! (ブラヴィッシーモ! Buravisshiimo!) was a nighttime water show at Tokyo DisneySea. The show featured water, pyrotechnic, and firework effects and was performed on the lagoon of the Mediterranean Harbor. The show was directed by Yves Pépin from ECA2 and used little dialogue, instead featuring an orchestral score by Gavin Greenaway. BraviSEAmo! replaced Tokyo DisneySea's earlier nighttime show DisneySea Symphony, and was replaced by a new version of Fantasmic! in 2011. The show ran from July 17, 2004 to November 13, 2010 and was sponsored by NTT DoCoMo throughout its run.

== Synopsis ==
The show begins with the lights around Mediterranean Harbor darkening, and a pre-show musical portion plays while mist blows across the lagoon. As the pre-show ends, a horn call is heard, and spotlights form a large pentagram in the sky. Mickey Mouse then enters in an aquatic chariot pulled by sea horses. Mickey is dressed as a sea prince, with a flowing robe, a crown of large golden tasseled feathers, and a trident. After sailing around the lagoon, Mickey welcomes the audience "to this world of magic," sending fireworks out of his trident as low-level fireworks blanket the water in sparks. He asks if the audience wonders how such a mysterious place exists, and if they want to know the story "that only the Sea and Wind know." Mickey and chariot exit as a Male Narrator describes the story. In the far distant past, a Water Spirit and a Fire Spirit lived in this place, but each inhabited its own world without ever seeing the other's face. The story, and show, tell of their first meeting.

Fountains then begin to spray on the lagoon from stationary barges, forming water patterns in time with the gentle music of the Water Spirit Bellisea. This proceeds for several minutes until the music fades. It is replaced by the wordless female voice of Bellisea, who appears on the water in the form of a woman made from flowing water. Bellisea moves through the lagoon on a barge, her appearance created by water spraying from a metal scaffold to form her arms, hair, and skirt from water. After reaching the far end of the lagoon, the music fades and Bellisea disappears into slumber.

An aggressive drumbeat and thunder sound ring out as fireworks launch from Mount Prometheus, the volcano located adjacent to Mediterranean Harbor. Plumes of fire then shoot from the lagoon as the music speeds in intensity. The sound of male chanting, representing the voice of the Fire Spirit Prometeo, rings out as he emerges from under the water in the form of a mechanical phoenix. Fire burns on the lagoon in a rune-like shape, and flames shoot from Prometeo's wings. After remaining on the water for a moment, Prometo begins to retire.

It is then that Bellisea, reawakening, starts to sing from her end of the lagoon. Prometeo, taking notice, looks over to her. Bellisea continues to sing, and Prometeo joins, their voices harmonizing. Bellisea starts to move toward him, water streaming from her barge as fire flickers in unison from Prometeo's wings. As they come closer together, the fountains around the lagoon erupt, the music peaks, and symbolically, the two spirits fall in love. The show then enters its climax as the two spirits, 'swept away' by love, take on the aspects of one another. Prometeo's fiery wings change to curtains of sparks and his body sparkles with blue lights, and Bellisea launches fireworks from her barge. More fireworks shoot from Mount Prometheus, and low-level fireworks blanket the lagoon as Mickey, from off stage, exclaims "Bravissimo! Ha ha!" In a final blaze of fireworks and flurry of music, the show ends. Immediately following, the ending song "Swept Away" plays as Bellisea and Prometeo remain on the water, before finally vanishing from sight.

== Development ==
Although BraviSEAmo! was not the first nighttime show performed at Tokyo DisneySea, initial planning for the show began in 2002, the year after the park opened. Concept development began when Oriental Land Company show producer Koichi Sasamoto and his staff contacted French event designer ECA2 and Yves Pépin to brainstorm ideas. Sasamoto had previously produced shows for Tokyo Disneyland, while Pépin and its company ECA2 was known for creating the Eiffel Tower Millennium Show and Magical Sentosa show for the Sentosa Musical Fountain in Singapore; he subsequently went on to design a similar water show, Songs of the Sea, also for Sentosa. On the Walt Disney Creative Entertainment end, John Haupt served as the producer, while Thomas Tryon was the production manager. BraviSEAmo! was envisioned as being a summation of the entire Tokyo DisneySea. After deciding on the elemental love story concept, Sasamoto's team went to France to work out the practical effects details. Bruno Corsini of Marseille, who previously worked on the 2004 Summer Olympics opening ceremony, served as the lighting designer, while French-based Barbizon Lighting supplied the majority of the lighting equipment. Troy Starr, also of Barbizon, was the systems integrator. Christophe Berthonneau of Groupe F Pyrotechnie designed the fireworks for the show and provided 40 flame-throwers that were integrated into the Prometeo design.

Sasamoto's team then moved to Valencia, Spain where they visited a fireworks factory and built and tested a full-scale Prometeo prototype. It was at this stage of development that the flame-throwers were calibrated and the firework launchers were tested. After completing testing, Sasamoto returned to Japan and oversaw construction of the show-use Prometeo, which was manufactured by a firm specializing in precision machinery. After manufacturing, the show-use Prometeo was tested for 2 months in water conditions and installed in a 6-meter deep pit, which was constructed in the Mediterranean Harbor lagoon. The crucial difficulties worked out at this stage were ensuring that the electronics, flame-throwers, and fireworks could function even when underwater. Corsini also traveled to Japan, where he spent 1 month working out the lighting with the Japanese staff. Due to the park remaining open during this time, testing the light and water controls, as well as training the crew to use them, was conducted after the park closed each night at 11 pm. The size of the show-use Prometeo was 14 meters tall and 32 meters wide; the show-use Bellisea was 11 meters tall. The final development and production cost of BraviSEAmo! was 3 billion yen (nearly $37 million in 2011 dollars).

The BraviSEAmo! project and development included several technical firsts for Disney Parks shows. It was the first to use a Global Positioning System (GPS), which was used to track the four fountain barges and correctly locate them in the lagoon to ensure the fountains and pyrotechnic effects would be launched from their proper locations. The GPS was also used on the two largest show barges, the Mickey Chariot barge and the Bellisea barge, to help the operators correctly place them and hit marks in the lagoon. It was also the first to use a wireless LAN to handle all show communications, including lighting, fountain, and pyrotechnic controls. Wired Ethernet equipped with antennae were used for the land-based lighting dimmers, and standard Ethernet ports located around the lagoon were used for lighting programming positions. The use of wireless LAN was made possible by the lack of competing radio frequencies at the Tokyo Disney Resort.

The complex show lighting was run using DMX512 communication protocols. The Prometeo lighting rig consisted of 3,000 waterproof Japanese-made LEDs and 250 Birket Strobe-Brik strobe lights, as well as 2 narrow spot PAR lamps for Prometeo's eyes. Because the Prometeo rig had to remain underwater all day, the strobe controllers were all encased in stainless steel, and the strobe cables were waterproof. A total of 14 strobe controllers (eight 32-channel, two 16-channel, and four 8-channel) were used in all. The shore-based lighting equipment consisted of 42 Halto/Griven Rainbows, 42 Griven Everest CYM MSD700 fixtures, 10 Space Cannon Ireos Pro VHT 7 kW color-changing fixtures, Coemar NAT 2.5 kW and 4 kW fixtures using Tempest Lighting outdoor enclosures, 380 Pace PARs, 130 Hydrel waterproof PAR64s with custom dichroic color filters, and Aqua Signal marine floodlights. Electrol Engineering D625dx dimmers were used. The show was controlled using a High End Systems' Wholehog III console.

== Production ==
Daily preparation for each performance of BraviSEAmo! began at 1 am with 16 pyrotechnicians starting installation of the 850 fireworks used in the show. Pyrotechnic installation concluded at 12 pm. A total of 60 crew were trained for work on the show, of which 40 were actively involved in each performance. Each of the 4 fountain barges had a driver, while the Chariot and Bellisea barges each had a driver and a spotter. BraviSEAmo! was held once daily at 7:25 pm.

== Music ==
The score of BraviSEAmo! was composed, orchestrated, and conducted by Gavin Greenaway. Greenaway had previously composed the music for the Disney fireworks show IllumiNations: Reflections of Earth and parade Tapestry of Nations, both performed at Epcot. The score was recorded at Paramount Scoring Stage M in Hollywood, California by Tom Vicari. Bellisea's vocals were performed by singer Lisbeth Scott, known for her numerous film score performances. The theme song "Swept Away" was composed by Greenaway, with lyrics by Donna Elaine Miller, and was sung by Miller and Rick Logan. The vocals of the main show and "Swept Away" were recorded and mixed at the O'Henry Sound Studios in Burbank, California by Vicari. The score was mastered by Bob Katz at Digital Domain Mastering in Altamonte Springs, Florida.

While the dialogue of BraviSEAmo! is in Japanese, the ending song "Swept Away" was performed in English. A Japanese-language version was also created but was only used during the Tokyo DisneySea Season of Hearts promotional period, from February 14 to March 14, 2007. The alternate Japanese version was included on the BraviSEAmo! Complete album released in 2007.
