= ECA2 =

Event production company

- Type: Société Anonyme
- Industry: Amusement park, World's fair, Olympic Games Ceremonies
- Founded: 1974
- Headquarters: Paris, France
- Key people: Jean-Christophe Canizares, Yves Pépin
- Website: eca2.com

ECA2 is a French Event production company located in Paris specialized in creation, design and production of multimedia shows and large-scale events. ECA2 is member of the International Association of Amusement Parks and Attractions and also the Themed Entertainment Association. In 2016 the company has fifteen permanent employees, and is headed by Jean-Christophe Canizares. Depending on the project, ECA2 hires up to a hundred specialists, including architects, project management, technical director, sound designer, lighting designer, and art direction. Since more than thirty years, ECA2 has created and produced projects in France, China, Singapore, Mexico and around the world.

== History ==
ECA2 was established in 1974. It has mainly worked on special events such as World's fairs, Olympic Games Ceremonies and permanent shows for leisure and amusement parks.

In 1989, ECA2 and Yves Pépin created the first water screen display. In the 1990s the company patented the "Aqua Scan", a process to project cinema size images on a water screen, which was later adopted by Disney and Universal Studios.

In 2012, ECA2 created, designed and produced the Big-O Show for the international Yeosu Expo 2012, South Korea. This entailed developing the Cascade Screen, a large water curtain.

== Productions ==
ECA2 has managed productions for many events, including the 25th anniversary of the United Arab Emirates in 1996, the 1998 FIFA World Cup Ceremonies in Stade de France, the Eiffel Tower Millennium Show, the 2003 All-Africa Games in Abuja Stadium, Nigeria, and the "Luz y voces del Tajin" in Veracruz, Mexico, 2002 to 2004. Other ceremonies include the opening and closing ceremonies of the 2004 Summer Paralympics in Athens and the Beijing 2008 Olympic Games, Royal Weddings in Qatar, the 2011 Summer Universiade, Shenzhen, the 50th anniversary of Togo's Independence in 2011, and the "Circle of Light Festival" on the Red Square in, Moscow in 2012.

ECA2 has also produced a number of permanent shows, beginning in 1998 with "Poseidon's Fury" at Universal's Islands of Adventure in Orlando. In 2002, the company produced "Le Lac aux Images" and "Le Miroir d'Uranie" at Futuroscope in France, and Magical Sentosa, on Sentosa Island in Singapore. In 2004 ECA2 set up an installation at City Mall in Nanjing and another, "BraviSEAmo!, at Tokyo Disney Sea. ECA2 created "Songs of the Sea" on Sentosa Island, Singapore in 2007 and "Le Mystère de la note Bleue" at Futuroscope in 2009. In 2010 they set up "The Ancient Secret" at Akshardham Temple, India, and in 2011 they created "Mangrove Groove" in Shenzhen, China. "Big-O, Wonderful Moonkey", was set up for Expo 2012 in South Korea, and a display was also created for Beijing National Stadium. ECA2 also created productions for World's Fairs (Expos) in 1998, 2001, 2001, and 2010. In 2022 ECA2 delivered Kiss The Stars Show in Phu Quoc, Vietnam.

== Prizes and awards ==
- 1999 Themed Entertainment Association AWARD (United States) - "ACQUAMATRIX", Lisbon World Expo '98
- 1999 Prix FICHE (France) - 1998 FIFA World Cup Ceremonies, Stade de France, Paris
- 2000 Themed Entertainment Association AWARD (United States) - Eiffel Tower Millennium Show, Paris
- 2000 PRIX FICHE (France) - Eiffel Tower Millennium Show, Paris
- 2002 Prix FICHE (France) - "Luz y voces del Tajin", Veracruz, Mexico
- 2002 Prix FICHE (France) - "KIRARA STARLIGHT FANTASY", Yamaguchi Expo 2001, Japan
- 2002 TILE AWARD (UK) - "GLOBOVISION" at Palais de l'équilibre, Expo.02, Switzerland
- 2003 Themed Entertainment Association AWARD (United States) - "Luz y voces del Tajin", Veracruz, Mexico
- 2006 Themed Entertainment Association Lifetime Achievement Award (United States) - Yves Pépin
- 2007 Themed Entertainment Association AWARD (United States) - "Movement is Life", Aichi World Expo 2005, Japan
- 2008 Best Tourist Attraction in Southeast Asia (ASEAN) - "Songs of the Sea" on Sentosa Island, Singapore
- 2008 Themed Entertainment Association AWARD (United States) - "Songs of the Sea" on Sentosa Island, Singapore
- 2012 Themed Entertainment Association AWARD (United States) - The Big-O Show, Yeosu Expo 2012, South Korea
- 2015 Themed Entertainment Association AWARD (United States) - "Wings of Time" on Sentosa Island, Singapore
- 2016 Themed Entertainment Association AWARD (United States) - "Fountain of Dreams" in Wuyi Mountains, Wuyishan, Fujian, China
