= Fountain Gardens =

Former garden promenade attraction in Singapore

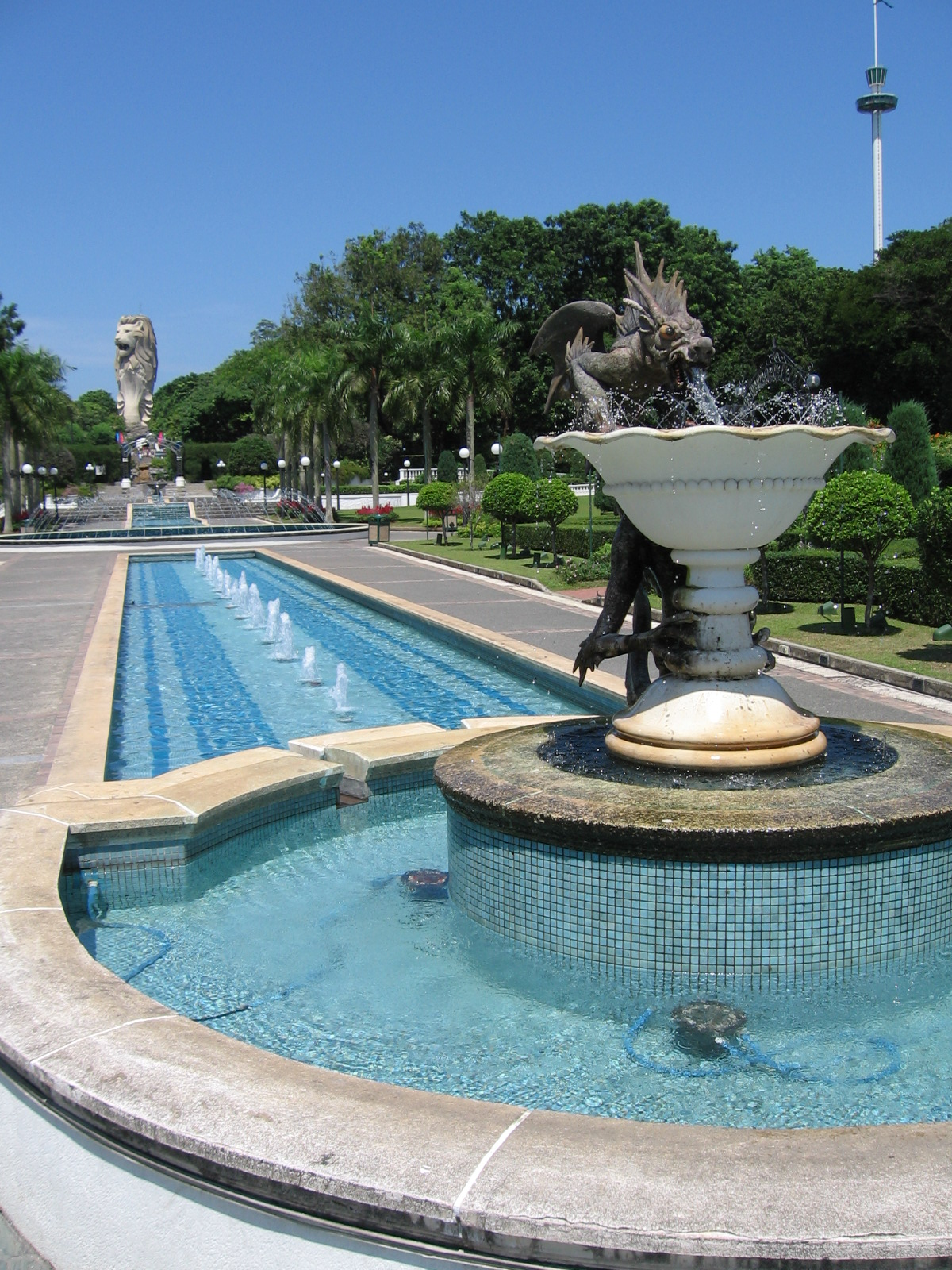
The Dragon Fountain at the start of garden promenade sequence

Sentosa Fountain Gardens (or simply known as the Fountain Gardens) was a garden promenade attraction on the western part of Sentosa Island, Singapore, which opened in 1989. It was located in the Imbiah Lookout zone of the island. In 2007, the gardens and their surrounding attractions were cleared to make way for Resorts World Sentosa, a large integrated resort complex featuring new entertainment and leisure facilities.

== Features ==
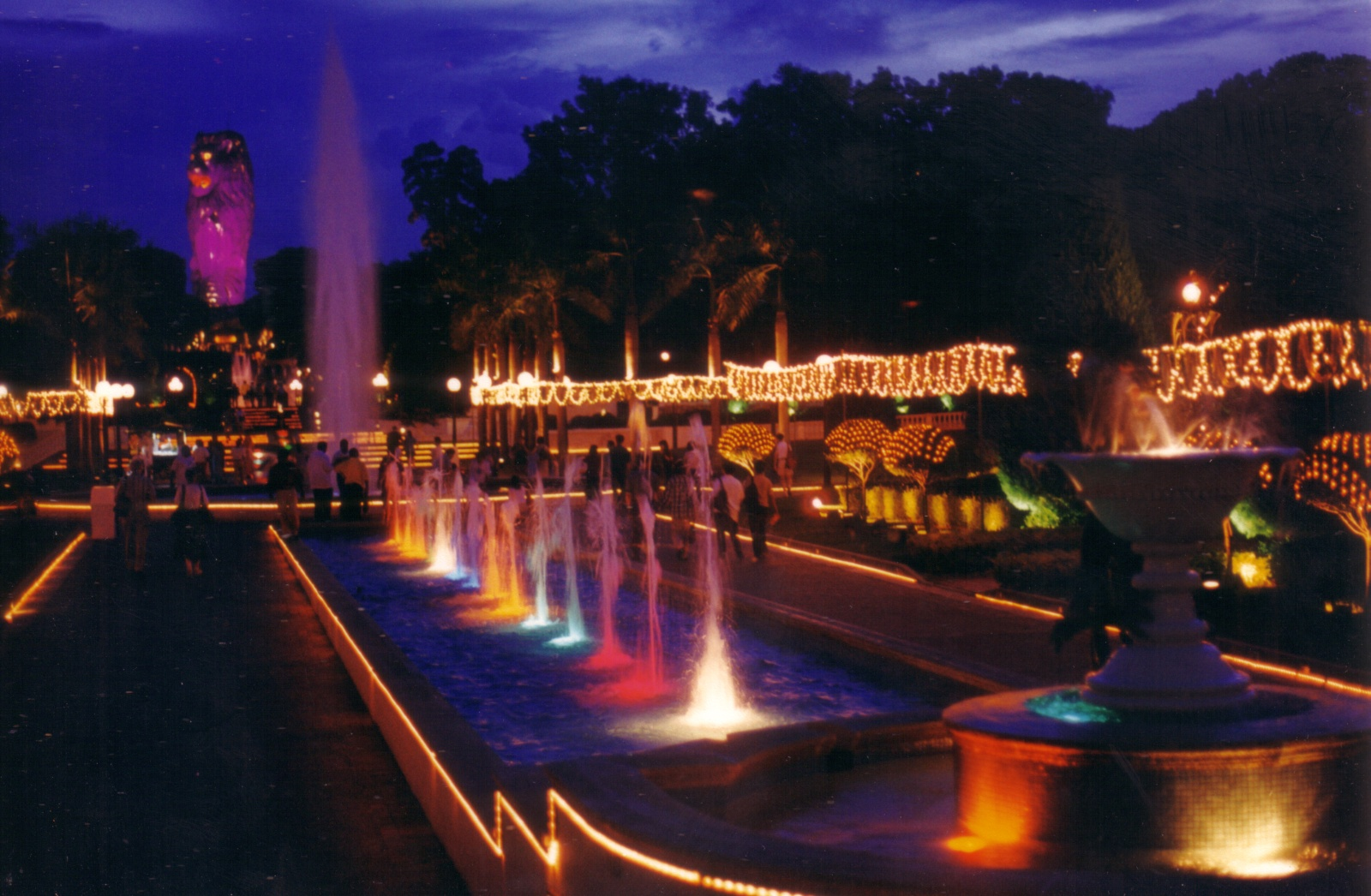
The former gardens at twilight, before the Sentosa Musical Fountain show began.

Start

The promenade began at the plaza of a fountain with a sculpted dragon statue. Its spouting snout faced the former Sentosa Ferry Terminal, welcoming new arrivals. The fountain was similar to another former dragon fountain that stood where the Tiger Sky Tower (former Carlsberg Sky Tower) now rises.

Route

The promenade's route passed by many smaller water features and European-style gardens.

The gardens were inspired by the French formal gardens from the era of Louis XIV. The elegant European-style gardens had over 25,000 plants, including palms, shrubs, bamboos, and vining creepers.

At the top of the Fountain Gardens terrace, there is a replica of the Villa Gamberaia landscape, a renowned 17th-century Italian Renaissance garden near Florence, Italy. It had a mini-stage for small performances. The gigantic 37 metres (121 ft) Merlion Statue, representing the mascot and national personification of Singapore, was prominently seen above the promenade.

Finish

The promenade terminus was at the entry gates of the former Sentosa Musical Fountain feature, a very large musical fountain grouping of coordinated individual jets and pools. Performances of water, mist, sound, light, lasers, flames, and animatronic 'host creatures' in computer choreographed programs had scheduled showtimes.
