= Cubix (disambiguation) =

Cubix is a South Korean animated TV series.

Cubix may also refer to:

- Cubix, a smartphone brand made by Cherry Mobile in the Philippines
- Cubix am Alexanderplatz, a cinema in Berlin
- Cubix International, a company that designed Lyo and Merly, mascots for the 2010 Summer Youth Olympics in Singapore
- Cubix Pictures, film production company in Singapore which made CGI film Zodiac: The Race Begins (2006)
