= Yves Pépin =

French event producer

- Born: Yves Pépin; Bordeaux, France
- Occupations: Creator of multimedia shows and large-scale events, founder of ECA2; now an independent
- Years active: 1974–present

Yves Pépin is a creator of multimedia shows and large-scale events including the multi-awarded Eiffel Tower Millennium Show. In the course of his career, Pépin's projects have been honored with many awards; an outstanding personal honor was received in 2006, when his peers in the Themed Entertainment Association, the international association for creators of compelling places and experiences, presented him with the prestigious TEA Thea Award for a Lifetime of Distinguished Achievements.

== Early life ==
A native of Bordeaux, France, Pépin pursued a specialist music education up to age 16. He later took a French postgraduate degree in economics and politics, and also received a French government bursary to attend a two-year, full-time education program at the Center for Research and Arabic Studies in Beirut. He worked as a French radio presenter and producer between 1968 and 1970 in Lebanon, Morocco and Paris. From 1970 to 1974, he was project manager and group manager at Orel, a communications company located in Paris. In 1974, he founded, along with Yves Devraine and Thierry Arnaud, the design and production company ECA2.

== Leading ECA2 ==
Under his direction, the company designed the logos for Concorde and Air France, among others, and produced the first interactive visuals for the Musée d'Orsay and the Louvre. After Yves Devraine and Thierry Arnaud departed the company, Pépin shifted its focus to the production of multimedia shows. In 1989 Pépin, a keen innovator, created and developed the process of Cinema on Water Screen (AQUASCAN®), a system subsequently adopted by Disney and Universal Studios, among others.

Yves Pépin has built a worldwide reputation as a designer and producer of ground-breaking multimedia entertainments for one-off, semi-permanent and permanent performance, including major world broadcast events as the Football World Cup 98 Ceremonies, the Millennium fireworks celebration show at the Eiffel Tower in 2000, advising for the Beijing 2008 Olympic Ceremonies, and producing several World Expo Night Shows.

== Today ==
Since 2008, Pépin has worked as an independent. In addition to his role as consultant for major companies and institutions, he is designing and directing multimedia shows, as for Akshardham Temple in Gandhinagar and New Delhi (performed daily); and multimedia concerts such as "Lost in Space" with Jeff Mills and l’Orchestre National du Capitole de Toulouse in 2018.

== Body of work ==
He has conceived and staged one-off productions for a host of landmark events, including:

=== Events ===
- "Lost in Space" with Jeff Mills: Toulouse, France, 2018
- Yeosu 2012 World Expo: consultant for "Big O" Night Show
- Beijing 2008 Olympic Games: artistic consultant for opening and closing ceremonies
- New Lexus launch show, Tokyo, 2006
- "Luz y Voces del Tajin," Mexico, 2003/2005
- Aichi World Expo 2005 (Japan): "Movement is Life," Toyota Pavilion
- Athens 2004 Paralympic Games: Opening and closing ceremonies
- Abuja, African Games (Nigeria, 2003): Opening and closing ceremonies
- Neuchâtel, National Swiss Expo 2002: Palais de l’Equilibre Permanent Show
- Yamaguchi Japan Expo 2001: Night Show
- 2000 Eiffel Tower Millennium Show (Paris, France)
- 1998 Football World Cup (Paris): Opening and closing ceremonies
- Lisbon World Expo 1998: "AcquaMatrix" Night Show
- Abu Dhabi, United Arab Emirates: 25th Anniversary (1996)
- Sevilla World Expo 1992: Night Show
- Disneyland Resort Paris: Opening Show

=== Leading permanent and daily shows ===
- "Sahaj Anand": Swaminarayan Akshardham, New Delhi (India) since 2014, still performing as of 2022
- "Sat-Chit-Anand": Night Show, Akshardham Temple, Gandhinagar (India) since 2010, still running as of 2022
- "Cinescénie," Puy du Fou (France): still running as of 2019
- "Songs of the Sea" Night Shows: Sentosa (Singapore), 2007–2014
- "Le Mystère de la Note Bleue" Night Shows: Futuroscope (France), 2009–2012
- "BraviSeamo" Tokyo Disney Sea (Japan): 2004–2010
- Magical Sentosa Night Show: Singapore, 2002–2006
- "Le Miroir d'Uranie" Night Show: Futuroscope (France), 2002–2005
- "Le Lac aux Images" Night Show: Futuroscope (France), 2000–2002
- "Mermaids, Myths and Monsters": SeaWorld Parks in Orlando FL, San Antonio TX and Aurora OH (USA), 1994

=== Water Screen ===
Pépin has also been credited with playing a big part in the invention of the water projection screen, a specialized fountain nozzle that directs a large 'fan-spray' of water in the air, on which images from projectors and lasers can be displayed.

== Awards ==
- 2006 Themed Entertainment Association (TEA) Thea Lifetime Achievement honors – first non-American recipient since the awards were founded in 1994
- TEA Thea Award in the Live Event Spectacular category: for "AcquaMatrix" at Lisbon World Expo 1998
- TEA Thea Award (2000) in the Live Event Spectacular category: Eiffel Tower Millennium Show, Paris, aka "Millennium Pyro Ballet"; "Year 2000 Starting Signal"
- TEA Thea Award (2007) in the Live Event Spectacular category: Toyota Group Pavilion in Aichi World Expo 2005, Japan
- Prix FICHE, Best Show for general public: for 1998 Football World Cup Ceremonies
- TEA Thea Award (2008) in the Live Event Spectacular category: for "Songs of the Sea" Night Show in Singapore
- ASEAN Best Tourist Attraction in Southeast Asia: for "Songs of the Sea" Night Show in Singapore
- Japan Award Special Prize: for new Lexus Launching show in Tokyo National Theatre
- TEA Thea Award (2003) in the Live Event Spectacular category for "Luz y Voces del Tajin," Mexico
- Prix FICHE, Best Show for general public: for "KIrara Star Light Fantasy," Yamaguchi Expo 2001, Japan
- TiLE Excellence Award: for Globovision system, Swiss Pavilion, Swiss Expo 2002
- Prix FICHE, Best Show for large audience: for Eiffel Tower Millennium Show 2000
