= Adventure Cove Waterpark =

Water park in Singapore

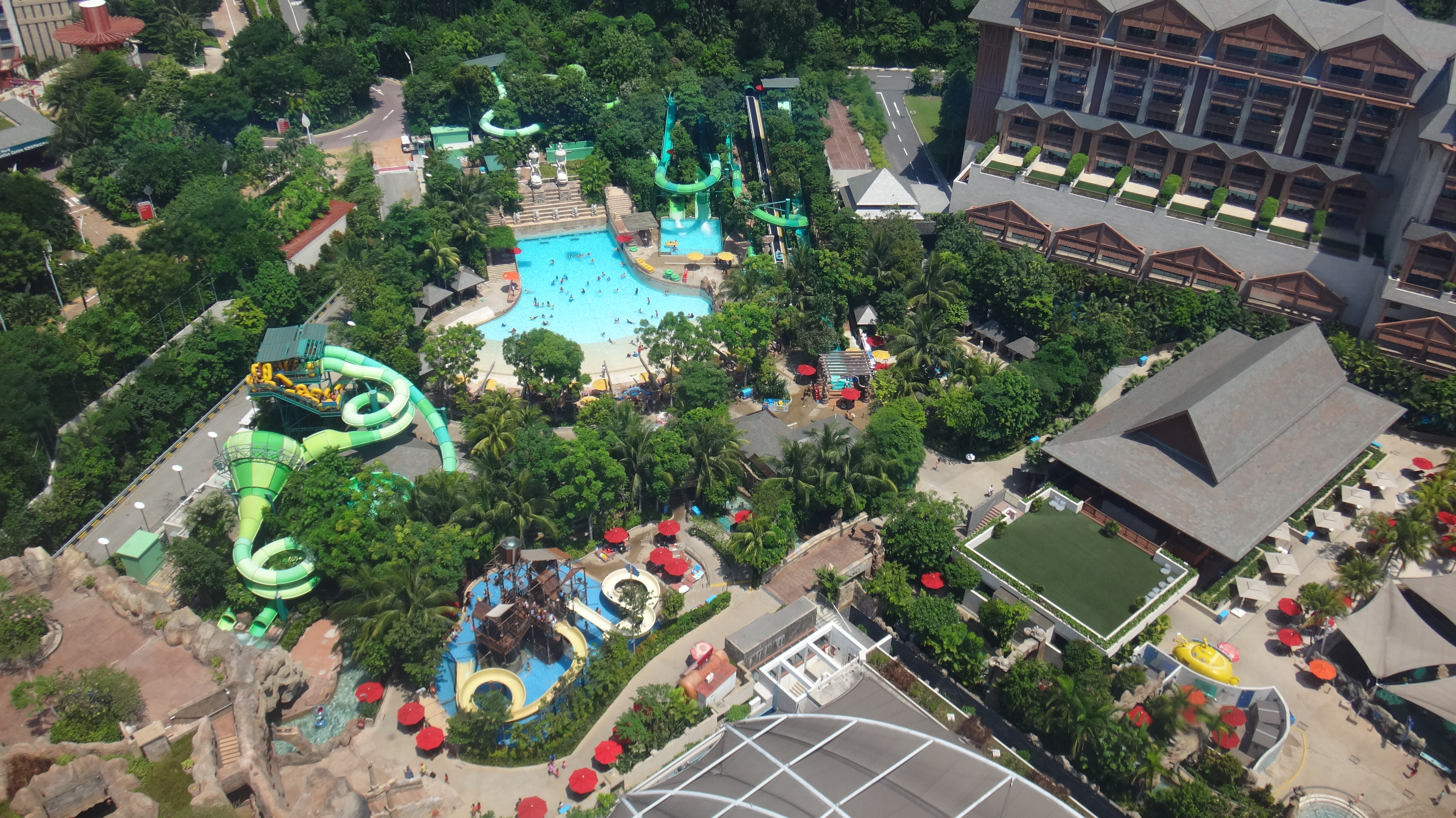
- A bird's eye view of Adventure Cove Waterpark in Resorts World Sentosa, Sentosa, Singapore in May 2014
- Interactive map of Adventure Cove Waterpark
- Location: Marine Life Park, Resorts World Sentosa, Sentosa, Singapore
- Coordinates: 1°15′27.7″N 103°49′04.0″E
- Opened: 22 November 2012; 13 years ago
- Status: Operating
- Pools: 2 pools
- Water slides: 7 water slides
- Children's areas: 4 children's areas
- Website: www.rwsentosa.com/en/play/adventure-cove-waterpark

The Adventure Cove Waterpark (simplified Chinese: 水上探险乐园; traditional Chinese: 水上探險樂園; pinyin: shuǐshàng tànxiǎn lèyuán) is one of the two primary attractions of the Marine Life Park, which is a part of Resorts World Sentosa, located on Sentosa, situated in southern Singapore.

== Background ==
Originally known as Equarius Water Park prior to its official opening, the Adventure Cove Waterpark was opened on 22 November 2012, the park features seven water slides, including the region's first hydro-magnetic coaster, Riptide Rocket. It also features pools like Bluwater Bay, a wave pool and the Adventure River. The 620-metre (2,030 ft) river, one of the world's longest lazy-rivers, have 13 themed scenes of tropical jungles, grottoes, a surround aquarium and more.

== See also ==
- Fantasy Island, Singapore
- Wild Wild Wet
