= NTUC Downtown East =

Entertainment hub in Singapore

Coordinates: 1°22′35″N 103°57′16″E

Downtown East is an entertainment hub located in Pasir Ris, Singapore. It is 147,000 square metres in area and was officially opened on 5 November 2000. It is run by NTUC club. It provides leisure and entertainment for families and youths. It competes with the two Integrated Resorts, especially Resorts World Sentosa.

== Attractions ==
Various types of entertainment features are being provided in NTUC Downtown East. Such features are shopping, arcades and others. The attractions include:

=== E!Hub ===
A five-storey leisure and entertainment hub, named E!hub, was opened in early 2008. E!hub's main features include:

- eXplorerkid, the largest indoor family park in Singapore
- nEbO City, a combination of a cineplex, gaming and cafe.

=== Wild Wild Wet ===
Wild Wild Wet is the largest-operating water park in Singapore as of January 2024, which features a 3-storey high raft water slide (known as Ular-Lar) that is the first of its kind in Southeast Asia. Wild Wild Wet opened in June 2004, 4 years after Downtown East's official opening. Currently competing with Resorts World Sentosa's Adventure Cove Waterpark, part of Marine Life Park, Wild Wild Wet has a total of nine water slides, and many other water attractions, one of which was sponsored by Yakult for a period of time. It also has a 18-metre slide called Torpedo. The riders would slide down at 70 metres an hour.

=== Escape Theme Park ===
Escape Theme Park was Singapore's largest outdoor theme park until Universal Studios Singapore took its position in May 2010. Opened in 2000, it operates on Saturdays, Sundays and gazetted school and public holidays. Its slogan is '360 degrees of fun', and had a total of twelve operating rides. It closed on 26 November 2011 due to declining business and the site was used for a bigger Wild Wild Wet and Costa Sands Resort.

== Accommodation ==
In 2015, a 5-storey resort and hotel combination accommodation, D'Resort, was opened. It was built over the former location of the Escape Theme Park and comprises 387 rooms.
