= Genting Singapore =

Singapore based leisure and resort company

Genting Singapore PLC
- Type: Subsidiary of Genting Berhad
- Traded as: SGX: G13
- Industry: Tourism, Resorts, Gaming
- Founded: 1984; 42 years ago
- Headquarters: Singapore
- Key people: Tan Sri Lim Kok Thay (Executive Chairman); Tan Hee Teck (President and Chief Operating Officer)
- Parent: Genting Berhad
- Website: GentingSingapore.com

Genting Singapore PLC is a Singapore-based regional leisure, hospitality and integrated resorts development specialist listed on the main board of the Singapore Exchange Securities Trading Limited. The principal activities of the company’s subsidiaries include developing and operating large scale integrated resorts, investments, casino operations, provision of information technology application related services as well as marketing support services to leisure and hospitality related businesses and investments.

== Overview ==
Over the last 20 years, Genting Singapore PLC has been involved in gaming and integrated resort development in Australia, the Americas, Malaysia, the Philippines and the United Kingdom. They also own Resorts World Sentosa, a S$6.6 billion integrated resort development in Singapore’s Sentosa island.

Genting Singapore PLC won the bid to develop one of two integrated resorts with casinos in Singapore in December 2006. It became the first operator of an integrated resort in Singapore when Resorts World Sentosa opened in January 2010.

After January 2010, Resorts World Sentosa opened four hotels, a casino, Universal Studios Singapore, celebrity chef restaurants, a resident theater show called Voyage de la Vie, free public attractions, and the Maritime Experential Museum and Aquarium. Resorts World Sentosa has 1,500 hotel rooms and tourist attractions such as Universal Studios Singapore and the Marine Life Park. In the third quarter of 2012, the revenues of the Genting Singapore fell almost 20% from a year earlier.

A company of the Genting Group, Genting Singapore PLC was named Asiamoney’s Best Managed Companies 2010 (Large-Cap Corporate of the Year in Singapore). It continues to assess strategic acquisitions, investments and collaborations.

After integrated resorts in Japan were legalized in 2018, in February 2020, Genting Singapore withdrew a bid for an integrated in Osaka, after bidding against MGM Resorts and Galaxy Entertainment.
