= Marine Life Park =

Marine park on Sentosa, Singapore

Coordinates: 1.2584°N 103.8177°E

- Interactive map of Marine Life Park
- Location: Resorts World Sentosa, 8 Sentosa Gateway, Sentosa, Singapore 098269
- Status: Operating
- Opened: 22 November 2012; 13 years ago
- Area: 8 ha (20 acres)

Singapore Oceanarium
- Status: Operating
- Opened: 22 November 2012; 13 years ago

Adventure Cove Waterpark
- Status: Operating
- Opened: 22 November 2012; 13 years ago

Dolphin Island
- Status: Defunct
- Opened: 22 November 2012; 13 years ago
- Closed: 1 May 2025; 14 months ago
- Replaced by: Singapore Oceanarium

The Maritime Experiential Museum
- Status: Defunct
- Opened: 15 October 2011; 14 years ago
- Closed: 2 March 2020; 6 years ago
- Replaced by: Singapore Oceanarium

The Marine Life Park is a part of Resorts World Sentosa, Sentosa, situated in southern Singapore. The 8-hectare (20-acre) park is home to two primary attractions: the Singapore Oceanarium and Adventure Cove Waterpark.

== Singapore Oceanarium ==
Upon its opening on 2012, the S.E.A. Aquarium had the distinction of being the world's largest oceanarium and public aquarium, a title it held through 2014, until it was surpassed by Chimelong Ocean Kingdom.

S.E.A. Aquarium ceased operations on 30 April 2025, to rebrand as the Singapore Oceanarium in July 2025 when expansions and construction were completed.

== Adventure Cove Waterpark ==
The Adventure Cove Waterpark (simplified Chinese: 水上探险乐园; traditional Chinese: 水上探險樂園; pinyin: shuǐshàng tànxiǎn lèyuán) is situated in southern Singapore. The park features seven water slides, including the region's first hydro-magnetic coaster, Riptide Rocket. It also features pools like Bluwater Bay, a wave pool and the Adventure River. The 620-metre (2,030 ft) river, one of the world's longest lazy-rivers, have 13 themed scenes of tropical jungles, grottoes, a surround aquarium and more.

== Dolphin Island ==
Between 2008 and 2009, Marine Life Park purchased 27 dolphins from the Solomon Islands in the South Pacific to be part of its attraction. Two dolphins died in Langkawi, Malaysia where they were temporarily housed before being sent to the Philippines for training and housing while the marine park in Sentosa is being constructed. While in the Philippines, local animal rights groups and Earth Island Institute filed a civil rights suit, and the Quezon City court issued a 72-hour temporary environment protection order to block the re-export of the dolphins to Marine Life Park on 14 October 2012. RWS reiterated that the resort's acquisition of the 27 Indo-Pacific bottlenose dolphins adhered to regulations governed by the United Nations Environment Programme under the Convention on International Trade in Endangered Species of Wild Fauna and Flora. Following another appeal, the block on the re-exportation of the dolphins was temporarily extended. Upon expiry of the blocking order, the dolphins were subsequently exported while the court appeal was ongoing. One of the dolphins, Wen Wen, died on the flight to Singapore, making it the third dolphin to die prior to the opening of the Dolphin Island within the park.

The Dolphin Island was closed on 1 May 2025 to make way for the expansion of Singapore Oceanarium. Two months later in July 2025, the Marine Mammal Habitat based on the Dolphin Island was opened as part of the Singapore Oceanarium.

== Transport ==
The park is accessible by MRT (via the Sentosa Express), bus, car and by foot.

== See also ==
- Fantasy Island, Singapore
- Wild Wild Wet
- Underwater World
