= Rainbow (ride) =

Amusement park ride

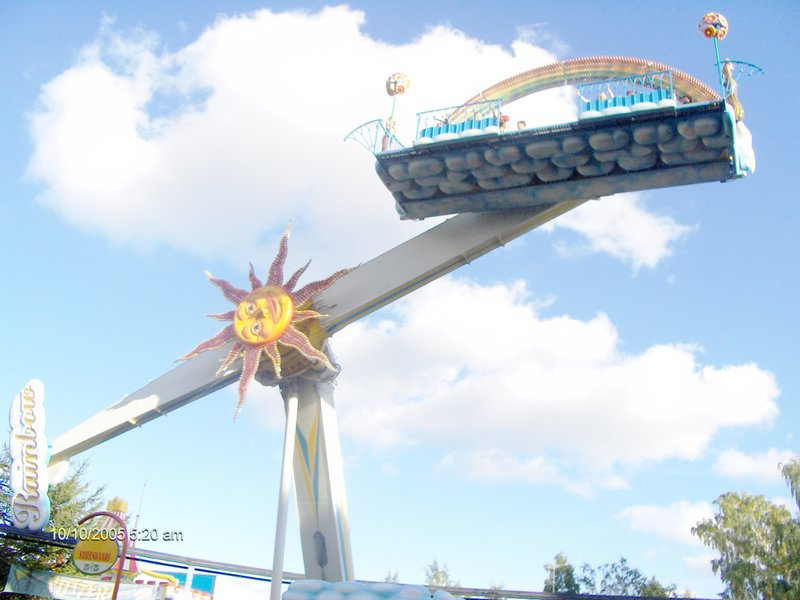
- Rainbow at Linnanmäki in Finland
- Status: Discontinued
- First manufactured: 1982
- No. of installations: 42
- Manufacturer: HUSS Maschinenfabrik

Rainbow is an amusement park ride created by HUSS Maschinenfabrik of Bremen, Germany (now HUSS Park Attractions of Budapest, Hungary). The Rainbow was manufactured from 1982 to 2000 and is often confused with its cousins Ali Baba and 1001 Nachts, among other similar models.

42 units were produced, which were seen towering atop midways all over the world. The more popular "traveling model" was created, plus several permanently installed "park models." Some units were converted to the opposite model later in their existence. It is believed that two units were converted from its older brother, the Ranger, which uses the same chassis and main support structure, except the Ranger flips riders upside-down, whereas the gentler Rainbow's gondola stays horizontal, leaving riders upright during the entire rotation.

A major accident in Liseberg, Sweden, during the 2008 season forced the shutdown and inspection of all HUSS Rainbows in service. The cause of the accident was improper maintenance and inspection of the driveshafts that hold the gondola right-side up. It was observed that regular inspections could not properly occur due to the design of the ride itself. HUSS ordered the replacement of the driveshafts on all remaining rainbows at a cost of about US$40,000 per unit, and ordered that access panels be cut into the bottom of the ride gondola so proper maintenance could be carried out on the driveshafts. Some owners chose to sell or scrap their rides, while others were upgraded and are still in service today.

== Design ==
The HUSS Rainbow was developed in the early 1980s using the chassis and main support structure from the Ranger, also built by HUSS, then adding a pivot to the end of the arm. This ensures the 33-foot gondola always stays upright anywhere in its orbit. It holds 36 passengers in three rows, with 2 riders per seat, for an overall capacity of about 720 riders per hour. An electronically controlled hairpin-shaped handlebar lowers in front of each rider to keep them seated; however, most of the time, riders floated somewhere between the seat and the lap bar. All HUSS Rainbows were upgraded with seat belts for added safety in about 2000, reducing the ride experience.

The gondola features two statues (typically Hawaiian girls) atop the front railing of the ride gondola. Underneath the gondola is an illuminated cloud that can be seen from the ground. The most popular design features cloud shapes on the side of the gondola with eyes and a smiley face painted on them. The upper end of the main arm displays a stationary cloud sign with chasing lights that spell "Rainbow" in cursive writing; this hides the two counterweights at that end of the main arm.

The traditional version has a blue and gold double V-stripe on the main support and orange flowers on the main arm, but some models had varying colours and themes throughout their lifespan. The gondola colours changed from ride to ride, and some custom units were created with different themes and configurations. Many units were later refurbished with modern looks and lighting, but a few classic-themed Rainbows still exist.

The Rainbow comes packaged on three (sometimes possibly four) oversized trailers or installed as park models. It takes a crew of four, about six hours to set up and four hours to tear down. A crane is used to erect the main shaft. The travelling model has a hydraulic ram that locks the main support in place and helps to raise and lower the support for regular travelling, but the park model does not need this to be attached and is removed after installation.

When installed, the ride weighed 65 tons and had a footprint of 20 metres (66 ft) x 17 metres (56 ft). When standing still, it was 20 metres (66 ft) tall, but had a flight height of 26.5 metres (87 ft) and was driven by four, 150 kW hydraulic motors.

== Operation ==
The ride normally runs manually with a joystick, although some models are programmed to run from a push-button panel.

The main arm and attached ride gondola can swing in clockwise or counterclockwise directions and stop or reverse at any point in its full orbit. It was customary mid-ride to stop at its upmost position, wait a while, and then reverse directions; however, many owners later decided to stop doing this.

The Rainbow's 36 hairpin-shaped handlebars raise and lower electronically from the main control booth. Most models have a foot pedal to ensure the operator is present, and some models are equipped with cameras to deter guests from sliding under the handlebars and standing up while the ride is in motion.

== Accidents ==
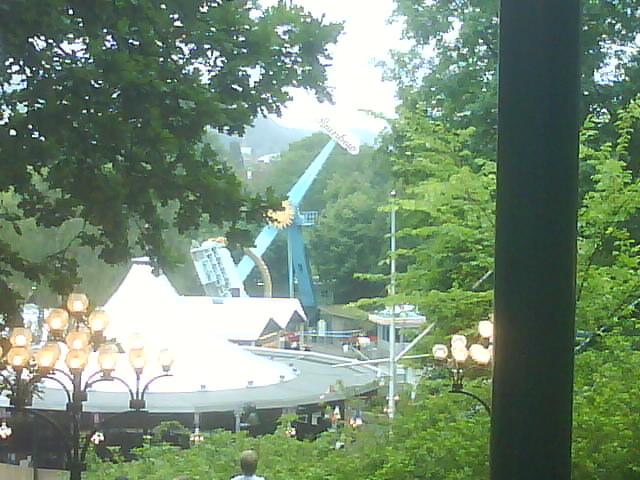
Rainbow at Liseberg collapsed

● On July 15, 2008, 30 people were injured when a Park Model Rainbow collapsed at Liseberg theme park in Sweden. The ride was dismantled for inspection on July 17, 2008, and investigators confirmed on July 19, 2008, that they had discovered a driveshaft designed to hold the gondola horizontal had failed, causing the gondola to jam at an angle as the arm continued to rotate. HUSS ordered the temporary closure of all Rainbows during their investigation period. Afterwards, HUSS ordered the replacement of the driveshafts on all remaining Rainbows in service and upgraded maintenance procedures for the gondola and driveshafts. This was the only time this type of incident happened with a HUSS Rainbow.

● On June 9, 2006, a 2-year-old boy broke his arms and legs after falling at least 25 feet (7.6 m) from the "Over the Rainbow" ride at Dixie Landin’ in Baton Rouge, Louisiana. He was seated next to his 3½-year-old sister but about 8 feet (2.4 m) from his mother at the time; his mother says she was told that the other adjacent seat was out of order.

● On May 26, 2002, a 28-year-old man fell to his death from the Rainbow at Elitch Gardens when he was standing up on the ride after unlocking his safety restraint. According to the park, the man was part of a group of mentally challenged individuals on an outing to the park.

== Appearances ==
Serial #	History	Photos
41301	Dragon Temple This is the first Rainbow ever built. In 1982, HUSS used the frame and supports from a Ranger ride and added a pivot and a platform gondola to keep passengers right side up during the full rotation. It began as a trailer-mounted model and was converted to a park model. It is still in operation today. The ride originally had blue seats, a rainbow-striped arm, three-colour V-stripes (pink/blue/gold) on the support (which was the standard livery on the Ranger), a bone as the counterweight sign with a tribal mask in the middle, and two tribal masks on the gondola fence. It was built without any lights. It was built for Showman Charles Dehner and toured Germany until it was sold to Serengeti Park in Hodenhagen, Germany, where it lived for 17 years before moving to Sommerland Syd Park, Denmark, in 2012, which closed a year later due to bankruptcy. It was sold to Legendia Park in 2014 and is currently operating. It was renamed "Dragon Temple" and themed with red-brown seats, a yellow arm with brown supports, and no sunface. It has flat metal dragon signs on the fence posts and on the counterweight sign. 1982: Built; 1982-1993: Charles Dehner (Munich, Germany); 1994-2011: Serengeti Park (Hodenhagen, Germany); 2012: Sommerland Syd (Denmark); 2014–Present: Legendia (Silesian Park, Poland); Currently Operating	[no media in Wikipedia Commons]
41307	Antibesland Rainbow Trailer-mounted model with orange seats, a white-textured arm, and an amazing light show! Named "Nuvola," it was the first of 2 Rainbows at Gardaland in Italy. It was pictured with white angels on the gondola instead of Hawaiian girls. It was initially seen with a red trailer. The ride was removed from Antibesland for the 2024 season and sold to a showman in Spain. It is currently believed to be in storage and awaiting repairs. 1982 or 1983: Built; 1983-1988: Buser (CH); 1988-1992: Gardaland (Italy); 1993-2001: Juchler (CH); 2002-2003: Stammler (Switzerland); 2005-2024: Antibesland (France; 2024–Present: Spain; Potentially Awaiting Repairs	[no media in Wikipedia Commons]
41308	Fleur Rainbow Trailer mounted model with a white arm with green outline and blue seats. It currently can only be found once a year at Fête Des Tuileries and is thought to be one of the best traveling Rainbows. 1983: Built; Unknown-present: The Fleur Family (France); Currently Operating	Rainbow ride no. 13
41312	Kentucky Kingdom Rainbow This was a park model that had a white arm with pink/blue sides on the main arm. Was removed from service as a precaution, after the accident in Sweden. It was probably sold for parts. Unknown: Built; 1994-2008: Kentucky Kingdom (KY, USA); 2009: Scrapped	[no media in Wikipedia Commons]
41313	Conklin Rainbow Trailer-mounted model with beige seats, white arm with pink vertical stripes, and blue/pink V-stripes on the main support. It was taken out of service by Conklin after the 1998 season, and appears to have been listed with Moser for sale. It is believed to have been bought by an owner in Mexico and its current status is unknown. 1983: Built; 1983-2000: Conklin Shows (Canada); Unknown: Moser Rides (appears to be sold); Unknown: Possibly in Mexico; Current Status Unknown	[no media in Wikipedia Commons]
47717	Wade Show's Rainbow Park Model converted to trailer mounted, with white arm, orange seats, and a square "homemade" counterweight sign (after a transport accident damaged the original Rainbow sign). The backdrop mainly used originated on a HUSS Ranger. In 2008 the Rainbow was taken out of service and stored in their winter headquarters until 2013, where it was refurbished with LED lighting, a new backdrop, paint-job and an upper arm mural. The square Rainbow sign still remains. The refurbished ride was unveiled in January 2014 at the South Florida Fair in the USA and is currently listed as 'Sold' on usedrides.com, but its current status is unknown. 1984: Built; 1984: New Orleans (Louisiana World's Fair); 1985-1993: Greg Link; 1993–Present: Wade Shows (Livonia, MI USA); Current Status Unknown	[no media in Wikipedia Commons]
47718	Wonderland Texas Rainbow White arm with gold/blue V-stripes and blue seats. This ride was last known to be operating, and is a popular piece among visitors to the park. It was observed in June 2024 that this ride was removed from the park's website and listed For Sale. It was purchased and in 2025 believed to be transported to Germany, and its current status and future are unknown. Unknown: Built; Unknown-1999: Reithoffer Shows (USA); 1999–2025: Wonderland Park (TX, USA); Sold and believed to be in transit to Germany	[no media in Wikipedia Commons]
47724	P.N.E. Vancouver Rainbow Proclaimed to be originally a park model with beige seats, Officially seen at Playland, Vancouver B.C. as trailer mounted with orange seats, white arm with flowers on it, and gold/blue V-stripes on the main support. It displayed the traditional two Hawaiian girls on the gondola and had a space themed backdrop. It was later fitted with gondola cameras by Playland as riders would often stand up or attempt to walk around the gondola. It currently is for sale, and has a wiggly bright coloured arrow pointing downwards on the main arm. 1982: Built; 1982-1992: Maple Leaf Village (Ontario, Canada); 1993-2000: Playland (Vancouver, Canada); 2000-2010: Legendia (Silesian Park, Poland); 2011-2012: Lunapark Borowiak (Romania); 2013-2023 Kocka Danijel (Romania); 2024–Present: Andrej Gusca (Lithuania); Recently purchased	Playland Vancouver Rainbow
47725	Magic Park Land Rainbow Trailer mounted, From 2000 to 2010 it was re-themed as "Millennium" where the rainbow and counterweight sign were removed. It was re-themed back to Rainbow by Klinkerfuß who gave it yellow seats with a light blue arm that had light strips down the edges and a yellow/orange squiggly arrow on the support. It has "Rainbow" signs on the fence posts. It was only at Adventureland for 1 season before being replaced by the Chance Rides Falling Star. Magic Park Land painted the arm a darker blue, removed the light strips, and painted the supports white. It was last known to be using the beach backdrop and displayed the serial number plate (33871) from a HUSS Enterprise ride that was removed from the park. It is believed that parts from the Heide Park Rainbow was used to refurbish this Rainbow in about 2010 by Klinkerfuß. This unit was sold in 2025 and is no longer displayed on Magic Park Land's website. Unknown: Built; Unknown-1987: Unknown (USA); 1988-1990: Ahrend (Hanover, Germany); 1991-1992: Rüdiger (Austria); 1993-1997: van Besien (Belgium); 1998: Adventureland Iowa USA; 1999-2006: Dehner (Munich, Germany); 2006-2007: Dehner storage 2008-2015: Klinkerfuß (Wiesbaden, Germany); 2016–2025: Magic Park Land (Ensués-la-Redonne, France); Sold in 2025	Millennium
48368	Myrtle Beach Rainbow Park model with white arm and orange seats and a blue base/trailer. It was last believed to be for sale, and its current status is unknown. 1984: Built; 1984 - 1987: Unknown; 1987-2006: Myrtle Beach Pavilion (SC, USA); 2012: For Sale; Currently Unknown	[no media in Wikipedia Commons]
49645	Heide Park Rainbow This is a Park model which was originally had a solid while arm and supports, and beige seats. It was seen with solid white clouds on the gondola and the counterweight sign was painted solid white, and had the standard lighting package and standard sunface. Heide park eventually painted the sunface solid white, and removed all the lights from the ride. For the 2007/2008 season, Heide park removed the sunface altogether. The ride was sold to German showman Klinkerfuß who used it as spare parts for their touring rainbow which is still operating today. 1992: Built; 1992-2008: Heide Park (Soltau, Germany); 2010: Klinkerfuß. Used for spare parts in their own Rainbow; Scrapped.	[no media in Wikipedia Commons]
12	Strates Rainbow Trailer mounted with caramel seats, white arm with red/blue V-stripes on the main support and a red trailer. It was bought new by Strates Shows in 1983 and sold at auction in 2009. It currently has a yellow trailer with solid white supports and is currently being refurbished but there are no immediate plans to finish the project. 1983: Built; 1983-2009: Strates Shows (FL, USA); Unknown: Young's Family Carnival (Australia); 2020–present: Luke Hennessy (Brisbane, Australia); In storage awaiting refurbishment	[no media in Wikipedia Commons]
13	Over the Rainbow Trailer mounted, Named "Over The Rainbow" with a white arm, yellow seats and a very bright and colourful backdrop. The gondola rainbow is dark colours. It is currently listed For Sale but remains featured on Dixie Landin's website. 1987: Built; 1987-1995: Royal American Shows (USA); 2004-2006: Wall Amusements; 2006–Present Blue Bayou and Dixie Landin' (LA, USA); Currently For Sale	[no media in Wikipedia Commons]
14	EsselWorld Rainbow Beige seats with a Yellow arm and supports with a white sunface, The mounted backdrop was formerly mounted on Schäfer's "Enterprise" Ride located in the same park. The park closed in April 2022 and all the rides are standing but not operating. The Rainbow is for sale and needs refurbishing. 1983: Built; 1983-1988: Showman E. Arnoux (Germany); 1989–Present: EsselWorld, (Mumba, India); Standing but not operating	Essel World 2015
15	Liseberg Rainbow This was a park model, which originally had blue seats and the traditional white arm and supports with flowers, and the traditional sunface, backdrop and lighting package. During the 1990s, the ride was painted pink, and the sunface was replaced by the Liseberg Park logo. In the early 2000s, the ride was painted blue and a painted picture of the sunface replaced the park logo. The seats may have been painted a lighter blue at some point and the statues on the gondola were removed. This Rainbow was too badly damaged after the collapse in 2008 that it was scrapped soon after the investigation had ended. 1983: Built; 1983-2008: Liseberg Theme Park; 2009: Scrapped After 2008 Accident	Liseberg ride in 2006
16	O'Neil's Rainbow Trailer mounted with beige seats and yellow/blue V-stripes. It features angels on the gondola, which OCS removed. It had a dark blue backdrop featuring clouds, stars and cherubs which OCS was not using., It has raised flowers on its upper arm arms. Possibly Push button controlled. main arm is painted two-tone shades of blue in 2006 by OCS Fun. The unit needs some repair and there are no immediate plans to finish it. 1983: Built; 1983-1988: Coney Beach Pleasure Park AKA Porthcawl (Wales); Unknown: Robert Crowley (Perth, Australia); 1988-2002: Wittingslow Amusements (Australia); 2002–Present: OCS FUN (O'Neals) (NSW, Australia); In storage (DYL's lot near Sydney). (April 2020)	[no media in Wikipedia Commons]
17	Pleasureland Rainbow Trailer mounted with flowers down the arms and raised flowers on the upper arm, a classic rainbow gondola with gold seats and classic counterweight sign. It was said that the sunface pivoted so it was always pointed the right way. Last documented with a surf themed backdrop. Button operated. It was for sale in 1995 and its current status is unknown. 1983: Built; 1983-1986: Ludewigt (Oldenburg, Germany); 1987-1990: Blackpool Pleasure Beach (UK); 1991: Pleasureland Southport (UK); 1993: Wally Shufflebottom (Clarence Pier, Southsea); 1995: Keith Emmett (Dealer); 1995: Believed to be sold to Germany or India Current Status Unknown	[no media in Wikipedia Commons]
41304	Serbian Rainbow Mounted on a blue chassis, this Rainbow's white main arm has rainbow coloured vertical stripes on the front, and lights that go up the sides of the main arm. Originally the arm was a dark colour and had white lights up the sides of the arm, which have been replaced with multi-coloured lights. Its gondola has blue seats and the main support is white, still with the original gold and blue V-stripes. It had a custom rectangular shaped counterweight sign with Rainbow printed right-side up and upside-down until it was replaced after the 2003 season for a traditional cloud sign from another Rainbow. It has since been updated with multi-coloured lights on the rainbow, and red and white lights on the Sunface Flares. The backdrop was refurbished in 2024. This Rainbow is currently operating in Serbia and is currently listed for sale. 1984: Built; 1984-1991: Eberhard (Hamburg, Germany); 1992-1993: Wegkamp / Nauta Bussink (Netherlands); 1993-1994: Osthold (Minden, Germany); 1995-1996: Hanstein (Bremen, Germany); 2009: Pihler (Serbia); Currently Operating/For Sale	[no media in Wikipedia Commons]
19	Great Escape Rainbow Converted from the parks Ranger Ride, this park model had a white arm with flower pattern on upper and lower arm. Gold seats. The ride was closed after the end of the 2007 season and was put into storage behind Desperado Plunge, then later scrapped in 2012. Replaced by Sasquatch in 2009. Its rumored that this unit started at La Ronde but some sources say not. ?1983 : Built ?1983-1987: La Ronde (Quebec, Canada); 1987-2007: Great Escape (NY, USA); 2012: Scrapped	Rainbow in storage at Six Flags Great Escape before being scrapped in 2012.
20	Finland Rainbow Originally, the arm was painted colours of the rainbow. At the turn of the millennium it was painted. After that it had white arm with gold/blue V-stripes on supports. Named Sateenkaari, previously known as Rainbow (1984–2003). In the summer of 2008, after the collapse of the Liseberg's Rainbow, Linnanmäki's Sateenkaari was suspected to be unsafe. The ride was closed in the middle of the season 2008. In the winter of 2008/2009, Sateenkaari underwent a thorough check, where it was found to be safe and it returned to use for the 2009 season. However, Sateenkaari needed major maintenance and it had to be closed again in September 2009, before the end of the season. At the end of 2009 the ride was dismantled and stored. Refurbishment of the ride was considered due to its great popularity, but in the end it ended up being scrapped. The sunface was saved and is on display at the park. It only had one owner. 1983 or 1984: Built; 1984-2009: Linnanmäki (Finland); 2014: Scrapped	"Sateenkaari"
21	Conestoga Named Conestoga. Wild-West Themed. It uses the seats from a Huss Pirate Ride instead of the typical Rainbow gondola that face toward the center of the ride. The ride was not operational for 3 seasons about 2015 as the park was waiting on parts. It has been observed that this ride has not run for the 2024 season and is apparently waiting on parts and a skilled operator. It is still listed on the park's website as of 2025. 1983 or 1984: Built; 1984-2002: Hersheypark (PA USA); 2002-2004: Hersheypark (Storage); 2004–present Lake Winnepesaukah (TN, USA); Operates rarely	[no media in Wikipedia Commons]
22	Elitch Gardens Rainbow Solid white upper and lower arm with orange seats. This unit ran until it closed in 2008. It was then eventually removed, and officially scrapped in 2014. 1984 or 1985: Built; 1985-2010: Elitch Gardens Theme Park (CO USA); 2010-2014: Storage; 2014: Scrapped	[no media in Wikipedia Commons]
23	Bobbejaanland Rainbow White arm with flowers and white seats. Had blue/gold V-stripes on the support. Originally, it had a statue of a woman in a large red dress and a pole with flowers at both sides of the cage, which were later removed for unknown reasons. The park Ordered a new ride named "Thrillennium" from Ronald Bussink for the 2000 season. They traded the Rainbow along with some other HUSS rides, a Vekoma Coaster and a small Monorail plus some money to construct this new ride. The ride was built by Nauta Bussink but was never delivered to the park due to a lawsuit regarding unexpected manufacturing costs, and demands from the manufacturer. The Rainbow was "given" to Nauta Bussink, and hasn't been heard from since. 1984 or 1985: Built; 1985-2000: Bobbejaanland (Belgium); 2000-Unknown: Nauta Bussink (Netherlands); Current Status Unknown	[no media in Wikipedia Commons]
24	Aztec "Aztec" is a park model currently operating in Iraq, With a blue and red arm and supports, yellow seats and a tribal thing in the center. In 1993 it had a rainbow arm and gold seats. It may have had a pink arm and pink seats after this, and the operator booth clouds were also pink at that time. It currently has a box-like gondola with no Rainbow theme at all. The lower arm of this ride is a donor from Jambore. It was last known to be operating in Iraq. Unknown: Built; 1992: Wingender (Mayen, Germany); 1993-1994: Langenscheidt (Aurich, Germany); 2000-2008: Walibi Holland Renamed "Aztec"; 2017–Present: Baghdad Island (Iraq); Currently Operating	[no media in Wikipedia Commons]
25	Jambore Gardaland's second Rainbow. Cavallino Matto restored this unit and renamed it "Jambore" only for the 2009 season, then it was later sold to Luna Park in France. It was standing but not operating for the 2020 season and was sold in 2021 for parts, and then scrapped. Unknown: Built; 1993-2001: Gardaland (Italy); 2008/2009: Cavallino Matto (Italy); 2010-2021: Luna park Cap d'agde (France); 2021: Martin Meijer; Sold for parts, then scrapped	Jambore
26	La Carreta Desbocada "La Carreta Desbocada" (The Runaway Cart/Crazy Wagon). Covered Wagon Theme. Formerly known as "Expedicion El ArcoIris". Rumoured to be used for spare parts or scrapped. This Could be the same unit that was at Hopi Hari. Unknown: Built; 1998-2014: Parque de la Costa (Argentina); Believed to be scrapped	[no media in Wikipedia Commons]
27	Crazy Wagon Named "Crazy Wagon". Looks like Conestoga. Unknown: Built; 1999-2011: Hopi Hari (Brazil); 2015: Removed; Current Status Unknown	[no media in Wikipedia Commons]
28	Kuwait Magic Rainbow Trailer mounted and has White supports with gold and blue V-stripes. It has a white arm with raised flowers on the upper arm and beige seats. The counterweight sign is lit in all red lights, but are no longer working. Was last seen without any rays on the sunface, but the gondola rainbow lights were still working. After the Iraqi invasion, the ride was badly damaged and was refurbished with a new gondola and decor. It is still be operating in Kuwait. 1983 or 1984: Built; 1984-2002: Yokohama Dreamland (Japan) ?2007–Present: Kuwait Magic Mall (Kuwait); Currently Operating	[no media in Wikipedia Commons]
29	Trono de Pakal A park model named "Trono de Pakal", which is almost identical to the Aztek Rainbow. It was last known to be in Spain, but since then its status is unknown. Unknown: Built; Unknown-2006: Port Aventura (Spain); Current Status Unknown	[no media in Wikipedia Commons]
30	Netherlands Rainbow This is a trailer-mounted unit. It has a white arm with flowers on it. Gold seats and blue/gold V-stripes. Its current status is unknown. 1983 or 1984: Built; 1984?: de Vries & Ropers (Netherlands); Current Status Unknown	[no media in Wikipedia Commons]
31	Flying Over the Rainbow This unit appears to be a park model called "Flying over the rainbow". A white arm, gold seats and mostly gold supports, with blue inside V-stripes. Its current status is unknown. Unknown: Built; Nanhu Amusement Park (China); Removed - Current Status Unknown	[no media in Wikipedia Commons]
32	Dizzee World Rainbow Trailer mounted, White arm had gold/blue V-stripes along with the main support, and gold seats. It was removed from the park for some time but then refurbished and reopened. It is possible that it was painted in dark colours with stripes at one time. It was removed from the Dizzee World's website before the 2024 season, and it appears to be removed from the park. Its current status is unknown. 1983/1984: Built; 1984-1991: Woburn Safari Park (UK); 1992-1995: Brean Leisure Park (UK); 1996–Present: MGM Dizzee World, India; Removed from Dizzee World Website 2024	[no media in Wikipedia Commons]
33	Aladdin Park model named "Aladdin". Magic carpet theme with colourful arm and support and no backdrop. Last to be known in Thailand and needing repair. Current status unknown. 1995: Built; Jerudong Playland Park (Brunei); 2007: Siam Park City (Thailand); Last known to be waiting for a new leveling gear. Current Status Unknown	[no media in Wikipedia Commons]
34	Japan Rainbow White arm with flowers, double counterweight sign, possibly blue seats. The park closed in 2007, and it is believed all the rides were left abandoned. Unknown: Built; Glücks Königreich (Japan); Park was abandoned in 2007, all the rides were left there. Standing but not operating	[no media in Wikipedia Commons]
42	Escape Rainbow This is said to be the last unit that HUSS built, however some sources believe this to be incorrect. It has a Solid Red upper and lower arm and had yellow seats which were last seen to have been painted blue. It was last seen without any sunrays but the original sunface was installed. It is believed to still be operating in Indonesia. 2000: Built; 2000-2009: Escape Theme Park (Singapore); 2014–Present: Hillpark Sibolangit, Indonesia; Currently Operating	[no media in Wikipedia Commons]
