= Escape Theme Park =

Former amusement park in Singapore

- Interactive map of Escape Theme Park
- Location: Downtown East, No 1. Pasir Ris Close, Singapore 519599
- Coordinates: 1°22′47″N 103°57′19″E
- Status: Defunct
- Opened: May 2000; 26 years ago
- Closed: 26 November 2011; 14 years ago
- Owner: NTUC Club
- Slogan: 360 degrees of fun
- Operating season: Year round

Attractions
- Total: 12
- Roller coasters: 1
- Water rides: 2

Escape Theme Park was an outdoor theme park located inside NTUC Downtown East, Pasir Ris in Singapore. It was opened in May 2000 and a water park named Wild Wild Wet located adjacent to it was opened in June 2004. Its slogan was “360 degrees of fun". The theme park operated on Saturdays, Sundays, gazetted school and public holidays. It had been a non-smoking park from 2005 until it ceased operations on 26 November 2011 for redevelopment. In 2012, reports confirmed that the park would make way for an expansion of Wild Wild Wet.

== History ==
The Government of Singapore wanted to have a first integrated theme park in Singapore. In 1997, Escape Theme Park was announced, located at Pasir Ris’s NTUC Downtown East. Construction started in 1998 with a planned opening in 2000. The park opened in May 2000 with 17 rides.

Between 2005 and 2010, 5 rides were removed from the amusement park for causing problems and accidents. Panasonic Alpha 8 was closed due to an accident in December 2005, Revolution was closed in 2007 due to complaints, Flipper and Inverter was closed in 2009 due to complaints and used for future use and Rainbow was closed due to an accident in Liseberg, Sweden on 15 July 2008 but was closed in 2009 and removed in 2010.

== Attractions ==
The park featured an equal mix of thrill rides and family rides. Some thrill rides include a pirate ship, 2 go kart tracks, 1 of which was catered to younger riders, fairground style rides, a walk-through haunted house, as well as the highest log flume in Asia. There used to be an indoor roller coaster, but it was closed to the public after an incident in 2005.

There were also numerous family attractions such as bumper boats, a family coaster, a Ferris wheel and a central pavilion with many funfair-style games.

Operating from 2000 till 2011
Thrill Rides
Name	Type	Notes
Daytona Beginner's Track	Go-Kart	A primer course to the challenging Daytona Go-Kart, featuring a two-seater car.
Daytona Go-Kart	Go-Kart	A much more challenging course and somewhat faster than Daytona Beginners' Track.
Pirate Ship	Pirate ship	Consists of an open, seated gondola which swings back and forth, subjecting the rider to various levels of angular momentum.
Wet & Wild	Log flume	The highest log flume ride in Asia, with the second drop measuring up to 5-storey high. Consist of 2 drops.
Family Rides
Name	Type	Notes
Bumper Boats	Bumper boats	Guests climb aboard individual boats and manoeuvre them, while trying to splash water against their opponent with the water gun.
Central Pavilion	Carnival games	Carnival games that operated on a "pay per play" basis. (Roller Derby, Water Vertical Game, Skatter Ball, Hook Me, Ring Toss, Hoops, Bull's Eye, Over Under Board and Spin 2 Win)
Choo Choo Train	Miniature train ride	A classic miniature train ride, with an engine boiler.
Family Coaster	Steel-Junior roller coaster	A Junior Coaster located near the entrance of the park. The only remaining roller coaster in the park.
Ferris Wheel	Kiddy Ferris wheel	A miniature Ferris wheel for the children. Located above the Haunted II ride, it gives the guest a panoramic view of the park.
Haunted II	Haunted house	An indoor dark ride. Guest enters a well-themed haunted house, with controlled lighting and sound effects.
Kite Flyer	Cliffhanger	Guests lie on their chest as the ride slowly rotates and ascend in height.
Red Baron	Fly Around Ride	Guests climb aboard these miniature planes, as it slowly rotates around its core.
Remote Control Boats	Radio-controlled boat	Guests get to control the boats on the water.
Defunct
Name	Type	Notes
Panasonic/Alpha 8	Steel-Wild Mouse	An indoor high-speed dark wild mouse coaster.
Inverter	Inverter	From a central pivot, the Inverter swings through cycles of 360 degrees.
Rainbow	Rainbow	Swings to a height of 9 storeys before falling back down again. It is the last Rainbow carriage to be built in the world.
Flipper	Tilt-A-Whirl	Sloped gondolas spin around a central axis while swinging back and forth.
Revolution	Enterprise	Gondolas spin individually, as the ride rotates and ascend around its own axis.

== Accident ==
On 2 December 2005, two girls were critically injured after being thrown from the subsequently discontinued "Alpha 8" Roller Coaster and falling 3 metres. The cause of the incident is thought to be a faulty safety restraint.

== Closure ==
With effect from 26 November 2011, Escape Theme Park has ceased operations. NTUC Club, the parent company of Escape Theme Park said that the theme park will be redeveloped to meet the changing needs of guests. The land which Escape Theme Park was on has been used to expand Wild Wild Wet and Costa Sands Resort. Escape Theme Park had entertained more than four million people since it opened in 2000.

== Awards and accolades ==
- 2007 Accredited Pro-Family Business

== See also ==
- Wild Wild Wet
- Downtown East
