= Ranger (ride) =

Inverting pendulum amusement ride

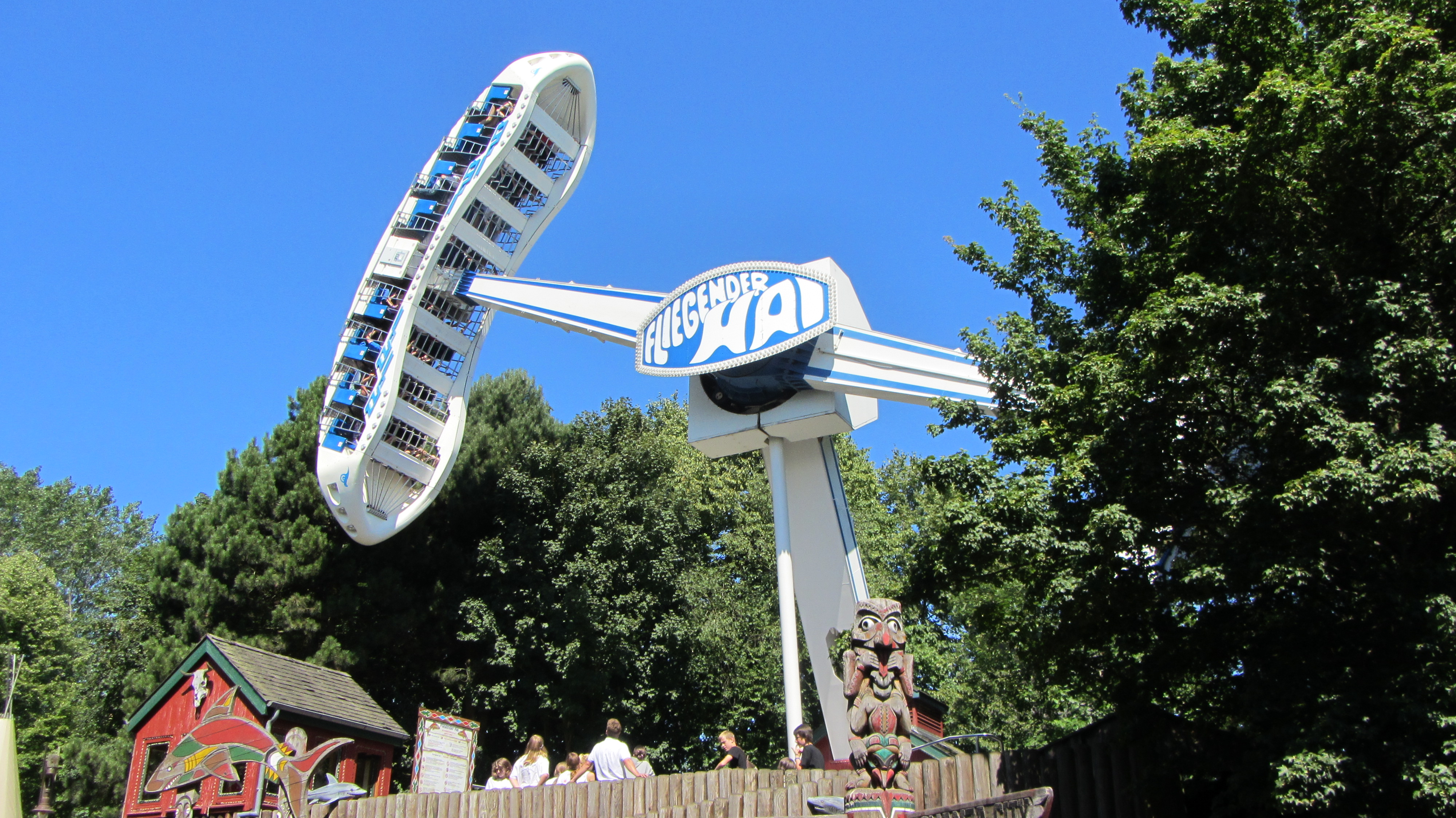
- A Huss Ranger at Hansa Park, Germany (closed in 2018)
- Status: Discontinued
- First manufactured: 1981
- No. of installations: Over 25
- Manufacturer: HUSS Maschinenfabrik

The Ranger was an inverting pendulum ride first manufactured by HUSS Machinenfabrik in 1981. The design proved influential in that many of its design elements were later used in the HUSS Rainbow, and for a time the term 'Ranger' became synonymous with inverting pendulum rides. The Ranger was the first inverting swing ride since Lee Eyerly's Loop-O-Plane and set the standard for many other attractions using an inverting pendulum ride system, like the Kamikaze, the Inverter, and the aforementioned Rainbow.

== Design and operation ==
The ride consists of a single 66-foot (20 m) arm linked to four 90 kW DC motors at the midpoint. A 40-seat gondola is mounted on one end of the arm, with passengers sitting five-abreast in eight rows, four rows to each side of the arm, so that riders are facing the transverse midplane of the gondola, where the arm attaches. On the opposite end of the arm is a pair of counterweights. The side of the arm facing out to the crowd of onlookers is decorated with an elaborate lighting array. The ride is designed to rock back and forth, before making several inversions, although the gondola can be inverted from a standing start thanks to being counterweighted. Unlike most pendulum rides, the Ranger is reliant primarily on the motors to invert, as opposed to momentum. The ride is capable of maintaining a speed of 8 revolutions per minute, and the gondola and arm weigh 65 tons.

Unlike most inverting rides, the Ranger uses a stomach restraint to secure passengers. A large rectangular pad is hydraulically pushed into the passengers' stomachs, keeping them pinned to the seats. Keeping the stomach firm while the restraints are being deployed is enough to prevent major discomfort during the ride. This system is unique to the Ranger and directly copied designs. The minimum rider height requirement is 48 inches.

Transportable versions of this ride can be racked on two 30-foot trailers: one for the station platform, support arm, and ride arm, and the second carrying the gondola, lighting, and counterweights. The first trailer also acts as the base of the ride.

== Variants ==
- Traumboot (Dream Boat) : Very similar in design, this attraction was first built at around the same time as the Ranger by WEBER Maschinenbau. The main difference between the two rides is that the side profile of the Traumboot gondola is flat, as opposed to the banana-shaped profile of the Ranger. Later machines were built by both HUSS and WEBER, using the name WEBER-HUSS.
- Looping Starship : A very large variant built only for amusement parks by Intamin AG in the 1980s. This ride uses a drive system that is much more similar to a traditional pirate ship ride, and features and open-air gondola, rather than a caged one. It also uses over-the-shoulder restraints as well as lap-bars.
- Kamikaze : A very popular design originally built by Fabbri in 1984. One of the most noticeable differences between this attraction and the original Ranger is that this ride typically features two arms rather than one, leading it to be known occasionally as a "Double Ranger". Riders also face outwards on most models, rather than inwards. Many other rides have been derived from this design, such as the Screamin' Eagle at Seabreeze Amusement Park, a floor-less model known as a Hawk, built by Zamperla.

== Appearances ==
Despite this attraction's age, a number of them are still operating worldwide, including in:

- Australia - One Ranger, at Luna Park Sydney (2020)
- Colombia - At least one Ranger, Martillo at Mundo Aventura
- France - At least one Ranger: A traveling model known as Ranger XXL.
- India - One Ranger, at Coochbehar Rash Mela in the city of Coochbehar, West Bengal.
- Italy - One Ranger, at Zoosafari Fasanolandia.
- Mexico - One Ranger, at Selva Mágica, Guadalajara
- Romania - One Ranger, at Luna Park in Mamaia, outside the city of Constanta (August 2012)
- Thailand - At least one Ranger, at Siam Park City
- Türkiye - One Ranger at Aktur Lunapark near Olüdeniz, Muğla

== In popular culture ==
The Looping Star, a Ranger which operated at the Adventureland amusement park in East Farmingdale, NY for much of the 1980s, can be seen in the music video for Chaka Khan's "Love Of A Lifetime" (1986).
