= Fantasy Island, Singapore =

Waterpark in Singapore (1994–2001)

Fantasy Island
- Interactive map of Fantasy Island
- Location: Sentosa, Singapore
- Coordinates: 1°15′15.1″N 103°49′24.0″E
- Operated by: Fantasy Island Pte Ltd
- Opened: 8 December 1994; 31 years ago
- Closed: 2 November 2001; 25 years ago
- Area: 7.1 hectares (71,000 m^{2})

Fantasy Island was a waterpark located at Sentosa, Singapore from 1994 to 2001. It occupied a portion of the current site of Universal Studios Singapore of the Resorts World Sentosa. Covering 7.1 hectares, the defunct attraction remained the biggest waterpark known to exist in Singapore long even after its closure.

== Background ==
Opened on 8 December 1994 at a cost of S$54 million, the 7.1 hectares waterpark had an 8-lane giant slide alongside a variety of high-speed water tunnels and aquatic attractions.

=== Attractions ===
There were about 16 different water rides at waterpark, notably:

- Medusa
- Double Trouble
- Gang of Four
- Black Hole
- Flashflood
- Wild wild wet

== Decline and closure ==
However, its popularity waned over time due to its high entrance fees and its inaccessibility. It was also known for its high injury rate that often resulted in several people getting injured, including the two drowning fatalities in 1998 and 2000. All these issues and accidents led to the eventual closure of Fantasy Island in Sentosa on 2 November 2001.
