= The Maritime Experiential Museum =

Coordinates: 1°15′30.0″N 103°49′13.8″E

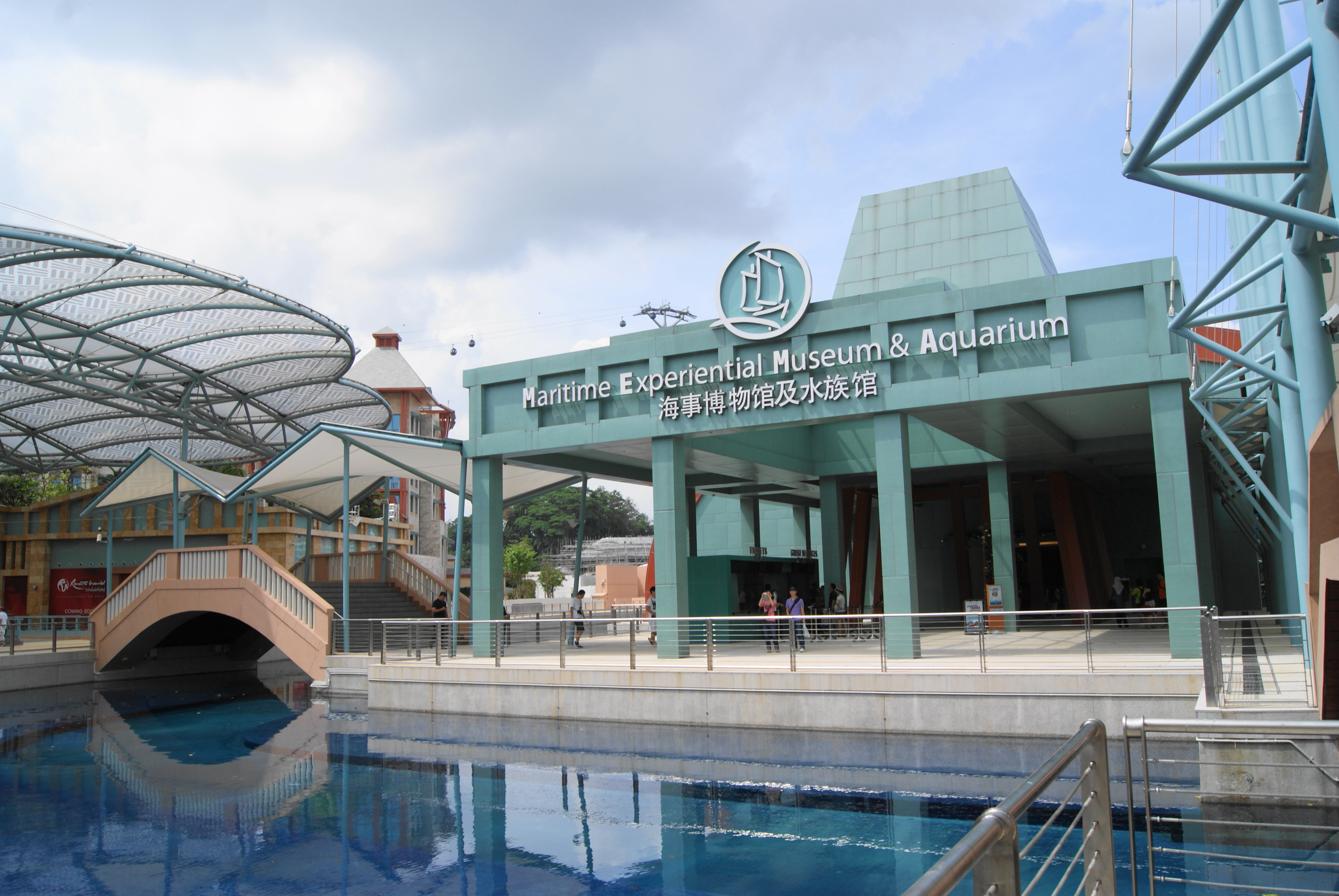
- The main entrance of the museum

- Location within Singapore
- Former name: Maritime Xperiential Museum; Maritime Experiential Museum & Aquarium
- Established: 15 October 2011; 14 years ago
- Dissolved: 2 March 2020; 6 years ago
- Location: 8 Sentosa Gateway, Singapore 098269
- Type: maritime museum
- Website: www.rwsentosa.com/en/attractions/the-maritime-experiential-museum

The Maritime Experiential Museum (Chinese: 海事博物馆及水族馆; Maritime Museum and Aquarium), formerly the Maritime Xperiential Museum and the Maritime Experiential Museum & Aquarium, was a museum in Resorts World Sentosa, Sentosa, Singapore, built to house the Jewel of Muscat. It was opened on 15 October 2011 and was closed on 2 March 2020 to become part of the new Singapore Oceanarium, an expansion of the former S.E.A. Aquarium.

== Attractions ==
The museum's main attraction was a 15m tall reconstruction of an ancient Chinese ship which is created based on historical accounts of Chinese mariner and diplomat, Zheng He's journeys to the "Western Ocean" (Indian Ocean). Behind the Chinses ship was a replica of a 9th-century Arabian dhow, the Jewel Of Muscat, which was gifted to Singapore by the Sultanate of Oman.

Surrounding both ships is the Souk Gallery which is a collection of dioramas of ancient markets in Vietnam, Indonesia, Sri Lanka, India, Iran and Malindi in Africa.

At the end of the gallery, the museum had a simulator, Typhoon Theatre, to let visitors experience what happened when a Chinese junk is caught in a storm. Visitors subsequently go down a water-themed walkway from the simulator into a gallery with artefacts recovered from a 13th-century wreck off Bakau in Indonesia.

== See also ==
- Jewel of Muscat
