= Singapore Oceanarium =

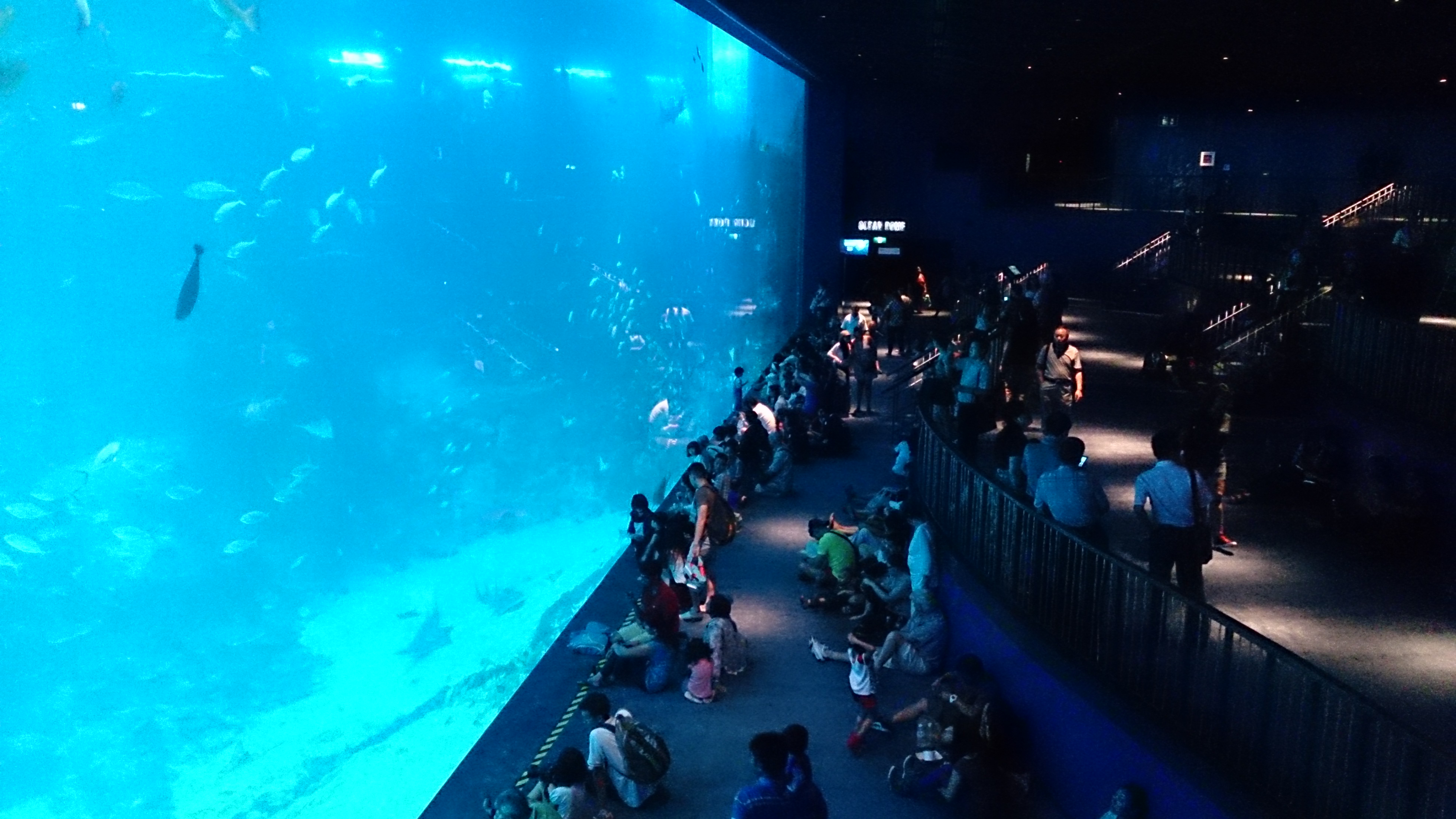
- Visitors observing the Ocean Dome exhibit at S.E.A. Aquarium
- Interactive map of Singapore Oceanarium
- 1°15′29.9″N 103°49′14.0″E
- Date opened: 22 November 2012; 13 years ago as S.E.A. Aquarium; 24 July 2025; 15 months ago as Singapore Oceanarium
- Date closed: 30 April 2025; 18 months ago as S.E.A. Aquarium
- Location: Marine Life Park, Resorts World Sentosa, Sentosa, Singapore
- No. of animals: 100,000
- No. of species: 800
- Volume of largest tank: 18,000,000 L (4,000,000 imp gal; 4,800,000 US gal)
- Total volume of tanks: 45,000,000 L (9,900,000 imp gal; 12,000,000 US gal)
- Website: Singapore Oceanarium.com

The Singapore Oceanarium, formerly S.E.A. Aquarium, is an oceanarium as one of the two primary attractions of the Marine Life Park, which is a part of Resorts World Sentosa, located on Sentosa, situated in southern Singapore.

== History ==
At the time of its opening on 22 November 2012, the S.E.A. Aquarium was the world's largest, by total water volume, containing nearly 45,000,000 litres (9,900,000 imp gal; 12,000,000 US gal) of water, and housing more than 100,000 individual marine, brackish, and freshwater animals belonging to over 800 species.

The aquarium was divided into 10 zones with 49 habitat exhibits. The centrepiece of the aquarium is the Open Ocean exhibit, which features more than 18,000,000 L (4,000,000 imp gal; 4,800,000 US gal) and 50,000 schooling fish, as well as rays, sharks, and other marine creatures.

The S.E.A. Aquarium had the world's largest underwater viewing panel, at 36-metre (118 ft) wide, 8.3-metre (27 ft) tall and 0.7-metre (2 ft 4 in) thick, built to give visitors the feeling of being on the ocean floor until the aforementioned opening of Chimelong Ocean Kingdom in Hengqin, China in 2014. There is also a conservation group called Guardians of the S.E.A.A., which supports research, education and public engagement efforts to protect the marine environment.

S.E.A. Aquarium ceased operations on 30 April 2025 for rebranding and expansion works, and reopened as Singapore Oceanarium on 24 July 2025. The expanded oceanarium is divided into 22 zones which showcases diverse marine life, each telling a story about the ocean’s past, present and future.

== Attractions ==
The main attractions include:

Name	Description
Shipwrecked!	Features a model ‘shipwreck’ beneath a simulated Karimata Strait (on the lower-eastern side of Sumatra). Marine species include the black-blotched fantail ray, bowmouth guitarfish, snubnose pompano and the zebra shark. There is also a side-perspective tunnel in addition to the primary frontal viewing area. Outside of the tunnel is a floor tank which includes the brownbanded bamboo shark and fluted giant clam. Although the aquarium only keeps female zebra sharks, two pups (named ‘Vanda’ and ‘Hope’) nevertheless were born in 2016 and 2021, respectively, through parthenogenesis; this rare phenomenon, which sees female sharks reproduce on their own (without a male spawning) has only recently been observed in zebra sharks. Parthenogenesis is known more from certain reptiles and amphibians, such as the mourning gecko.
School of Fish	The centrepiece of this area is the Coral Garden, a cylindrical tank with an artificial coral reef and a wide variety of coral reef fish like clownfish, Napoleon wrasse and many more. There are also a couple of seahorse tanks. Freshwater and brackish-water fish, like the suckermouth catfish and european sea sturgeon are also housed nearby.
Ocean Diversity	Allows face-to-face interaction with Indo-Pacific bottlenose dolphins. It is also home to the Tasmanian giant crab, zebra turkeyfish and many different species of jellies.
Open Ocean	The Open Ocean exhibit is a large tank, with multiple viewing panels, for thousands of individual animals, such as the giant grouper, Javanese cownose ray, leopard whipray, pickhandle barracuda and reef manta rays.
Quirky Adaptations	This area shows visitors the various evolutionary adaptations which different species of fish have developed to survive. Fish include the blotcheye soldierfish, bumphead parrotfish, elephant fish, old wife, payara, queen angelfish, and the weedy seadragon.
Underwater City	Most of the live corals are held in these tanks, with 100 species of hard corals and 20 species of soft corals, along with many fish, including the regal blue tang, and marine eels like the giant moray.
Apex Predators of the Seas	Visitors walk through a tunnel that allows them to view various larger shark species, such as the blacktip reef shark, sand tiger shark, scalloped hammerhead shark, tawny nurse shark and whitetip reef shark.
Aquatic Ecosystems	The final area in the aquarium features the Discovery Touch Pool, which allows visitors to touch and interact with black sea cucumbers, chocolate chip sea stars, epaulette sharks, green brittle stars, sea hares and sea urchins. Several species of poison dart frogs are also exhibited here.

== Gallery ==
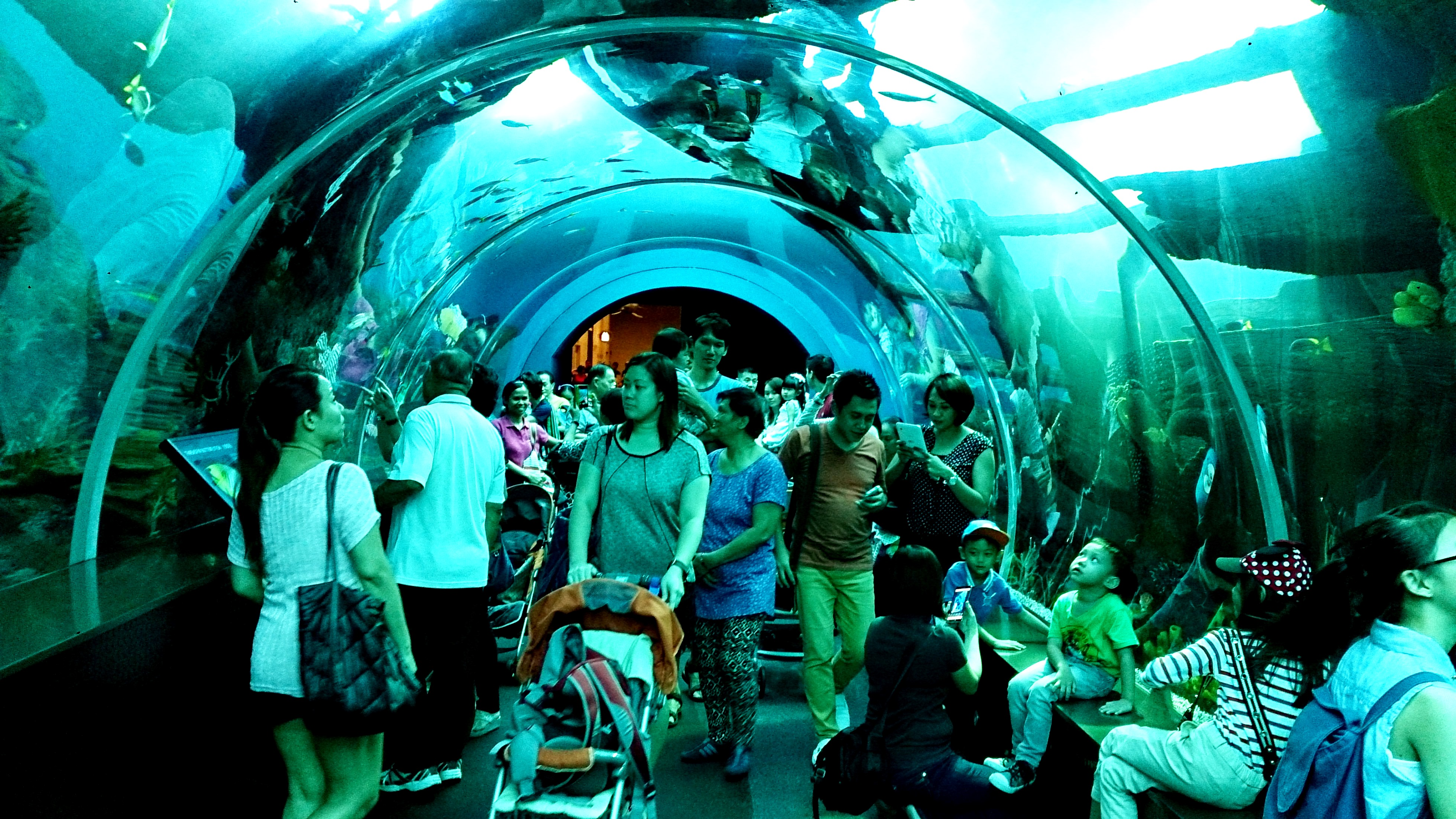

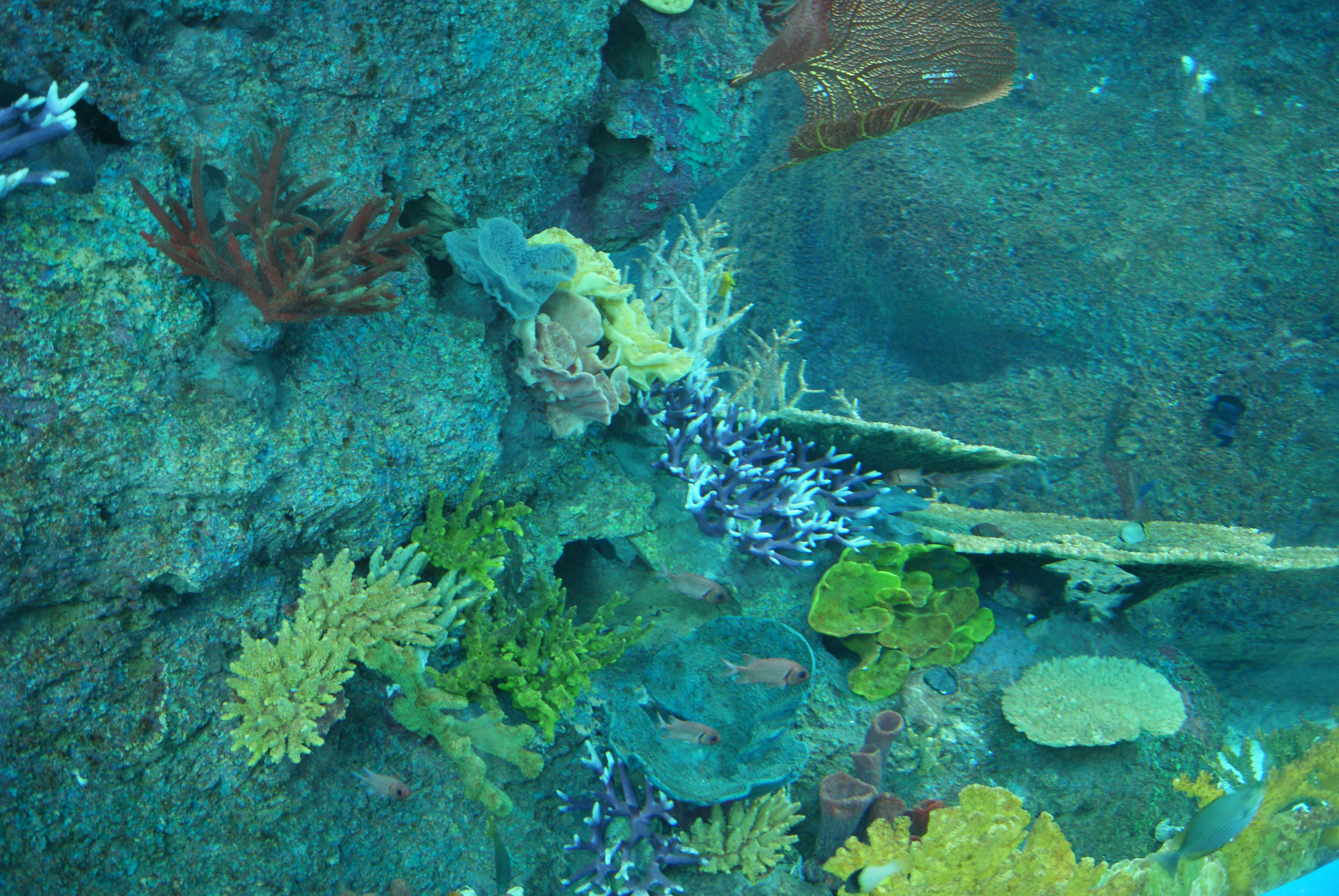

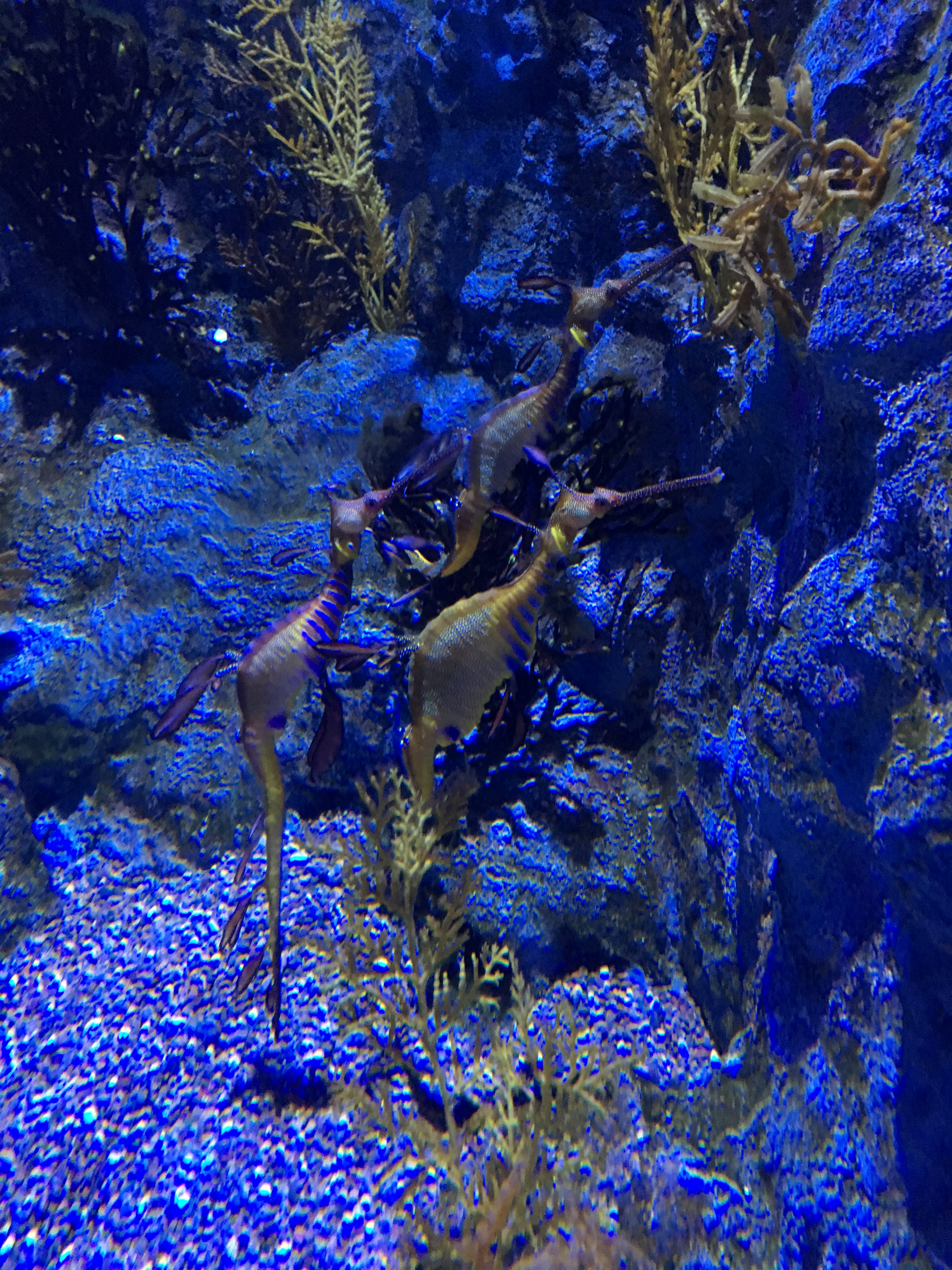
Weedy seadragon

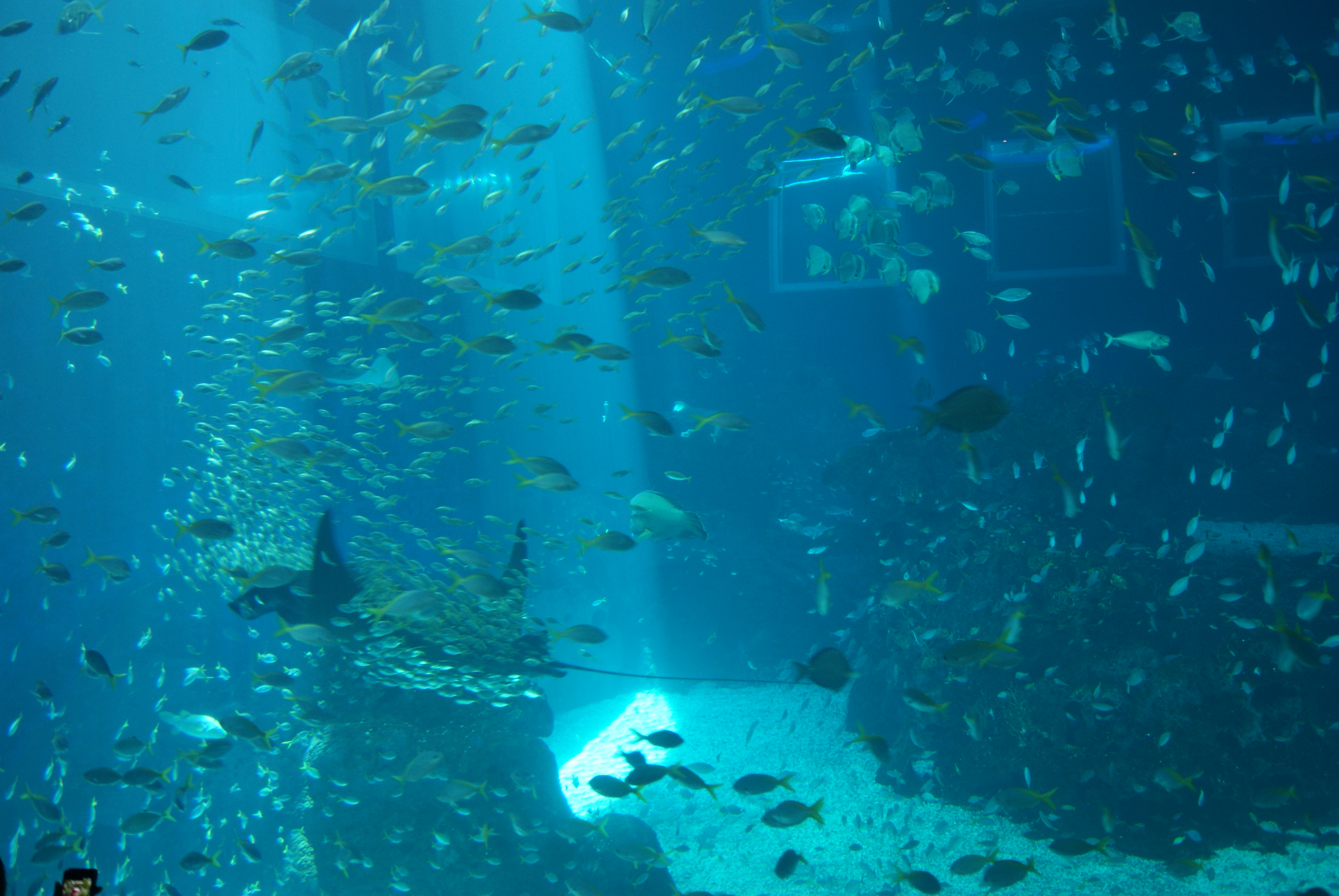
Open Ocean

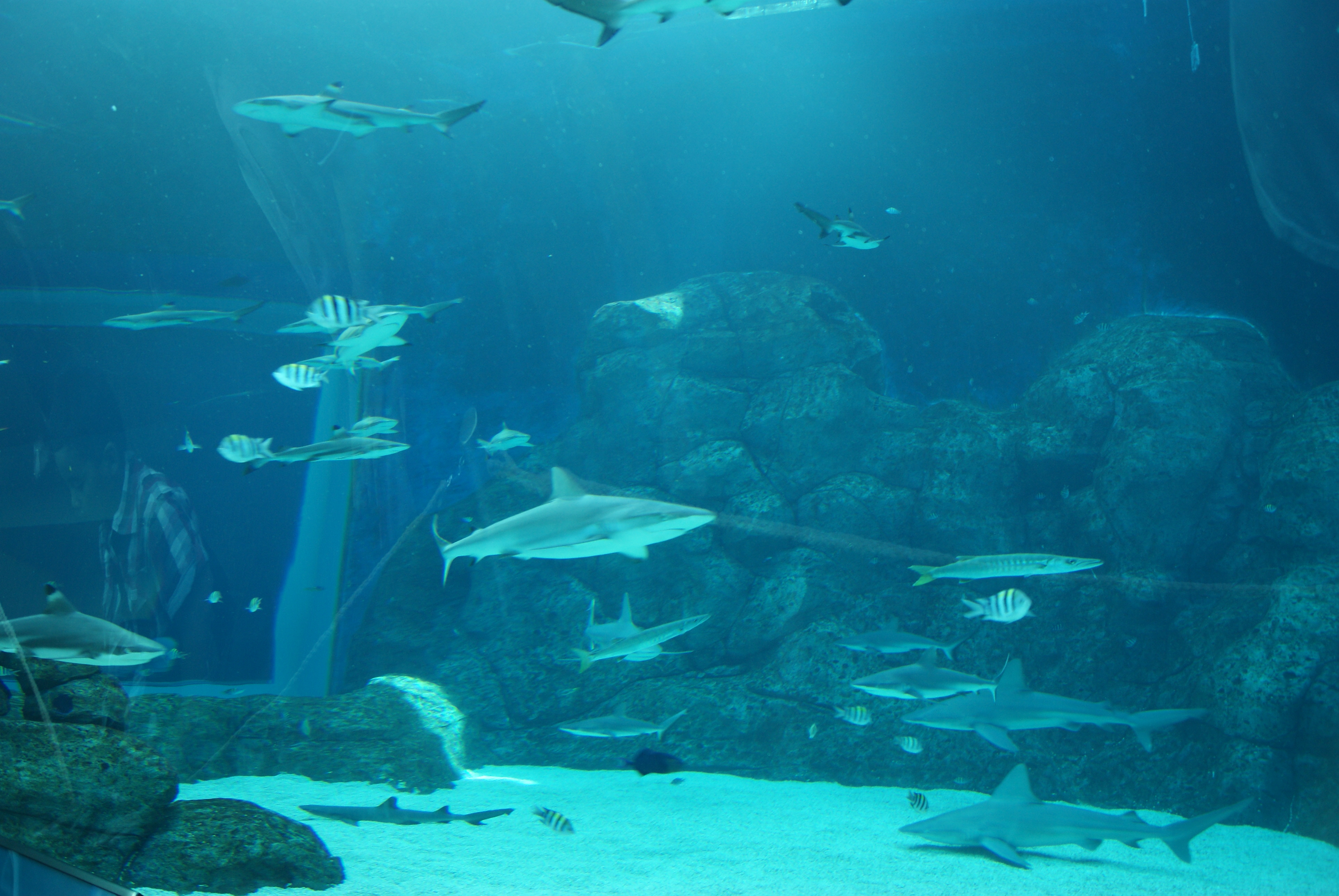
Shark Seas

== See also ==
- Underwater World
