= Wild Wild Wet =

Water theme park in Singapore

- The old logo of the park
- Interactive map of Wild Wild Wet
- Location: 1 Pasir Ris Close, Singapore 519599
- Coordinates: 1°22′38″N 103°57′14″E
- Opened: 5 June 2004; 22 years ago 1 November 2017; 8 years ago (Reopen)
- Owner: NTUC Club
- Operated by: NTUC Downtown East
- Slogan: There's a better way to get wet!
- Area: 4 ha (9.9 acres)

Attractions
- Total: 14
- Water rides: 7 (Before 2016 renovations) 14 (After 2016 renovations)
- Website: wildwildwet.com

Wild Wild Wet is a water theme park in Singapore. It is located at NTUC Downtown East in Pasir Ris, Singapore.

There used to be a small water park in Anaheim, California near Disneyland in the late 1970s to the mid 1980s, named Wild, Wild, Wet.

== Overview ==
When the former Escape Theme Park ceased operation on 26 November 2011, the site was used to make way for a bigger Water Park and Costa Sands Resort. Wild Wild Wet was closed from 23 July till 1 November 2012 for renovations that includes new rides and attractions. Wild Wild Wet was expanded to 4 hectares from the original 2 hectares, approximately the size of five football fields which will double the original size and feature seven new rides and attractions which opened in late 2016. NTUC Club said admission fees are expected to go up slightly due to inflation and increasing operational costs. The new rides have since been opened up to the public.

== See also ==
- NTUC Downtown East
- Escape Theme Park
