= Beer in Singapore =

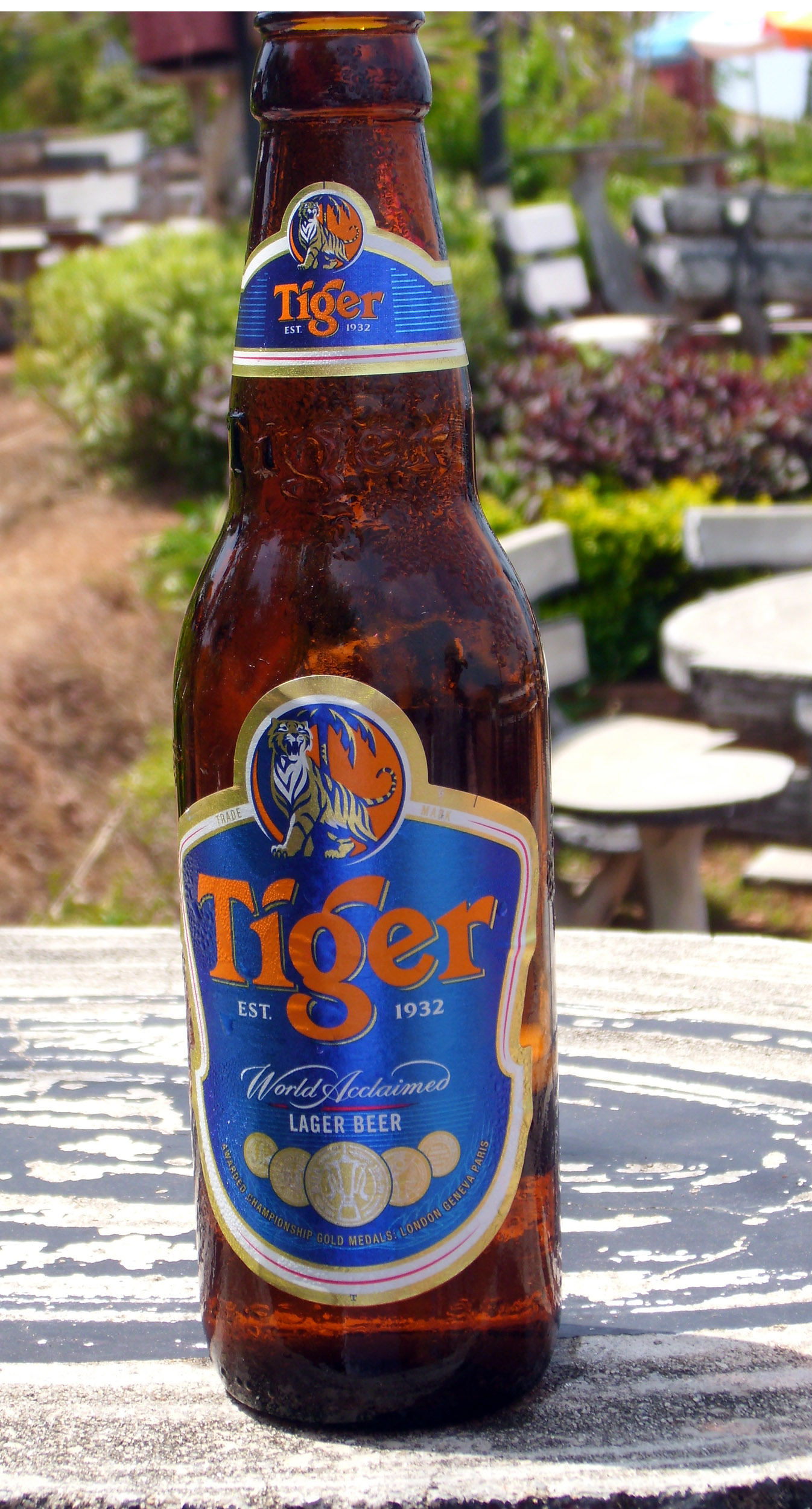
Tiger beer

The local beer industry in Singapore began in the early 1930s with the formation of Malayan Breweries Limited (MBL) in 1931 (which went on to produce Tiger Beer) and later Archipelago Brewery in 1933 (which went on to produce Anchor Beer).

== Commercial breweries ==
In April 1931 the first commercial brewery in Singapore, MBL, was formed as a joint venture between local soft drinks producer, Fraser & Neave, and Dutch brewer, Heineken. The company's first brewery, located at Alexandra Road, became operational in October 1932, with the production of Tiger Beer. In July 1931 the Archipel Brouweriji Compagnie (Archipelago Brewery Co.) was formed in Batavia (now known as Jakarta), by German brewer, Beck's, constructing breweries in both Singapore and Batavia. In November 1933 the Archipelago Brewery commenced operations from its brewery, also located on Alexandra Road, producing Anchor Beer.

With the outbreak of World War II, the British annexed the Archipelago Brewery in 1939, under the provisions of the Trading with the Enemy Act 1939 – deeming it enemy territory for its German ties – vesting its control with the Custodian of Enemy Property. In January 1941 a new company, the Archipelago Brewery Company (1941) Limited, was formed by Malayan Breweries to purchase the brewery.

Operations at both breweries ceased with the capture of Singapore by the Japanese in February 1942. The Japanese subsequently expropriated all the production facilities and ordered Dai-Nippon Breweries to produce beer from the breweries. Immediately following the liberation of Singapore in September 1945 by the Allied forces, operations at Malayan Breweries recommenced.

In 1990, it was renamed Asia Pacific Breweries (APB). In 2013, APB merged with Heineken Asia Pacific and was renamed Heineken Asia Pacific to reflect its role as Heineken's regional hub.

The most popular domestic beer brands in Singapore are Tiger Beer and Anchor. APB also brews Heineken Lager Beer under a license from its parent company, while Carlsberg is also a popular beverage with wide distribution around the island. Other notable brands Baron's Strong Brew and ABC Extra Stout.

== Local microbreweries ==
Since the mid 2000s a number of smaller microbreweries have been established throughout Singapore. As of 2020, there are now over fifteen microbreweries in the country.

== Craft beers ==
Singapore is home to a lively craft beer scene with hundreds of craft beer brands imported from around the world and well-represented in the island. Since the mid 2010s, craft beers are more available throughout bars, restaurants and hotels as well as retail outlets from supermarket to independent craft beer stores, both offline and online. Although craft beer sales only account for less than 2 per cent of Singapore's beer market, it is fast growing as consumer appetites and the trend of premiumisation converts more people into drinking craft beers.

== Beer festivals ==
An annual beer festival, Beerfest Asia, is held in Singapore in June each year. It was first held in 2008 and attracts over 30,000 beer lovers. The festival features over 500 beers and ciders from over 35 exhibitors around the world.

The Asia Beer Awards, were established in 2008 and ran in conjunction with Beerfest Asia until 2013. The awards recommenced in 2016. The Asia Beer Awards are the largest beer awards held in Asia, with 160 beers competing across 15 categories.
