= Skyline Luge Singapore =

Tourist attraction located in Singapore

Coordinates: 1°15′15.12″N 103°48′58.68″E

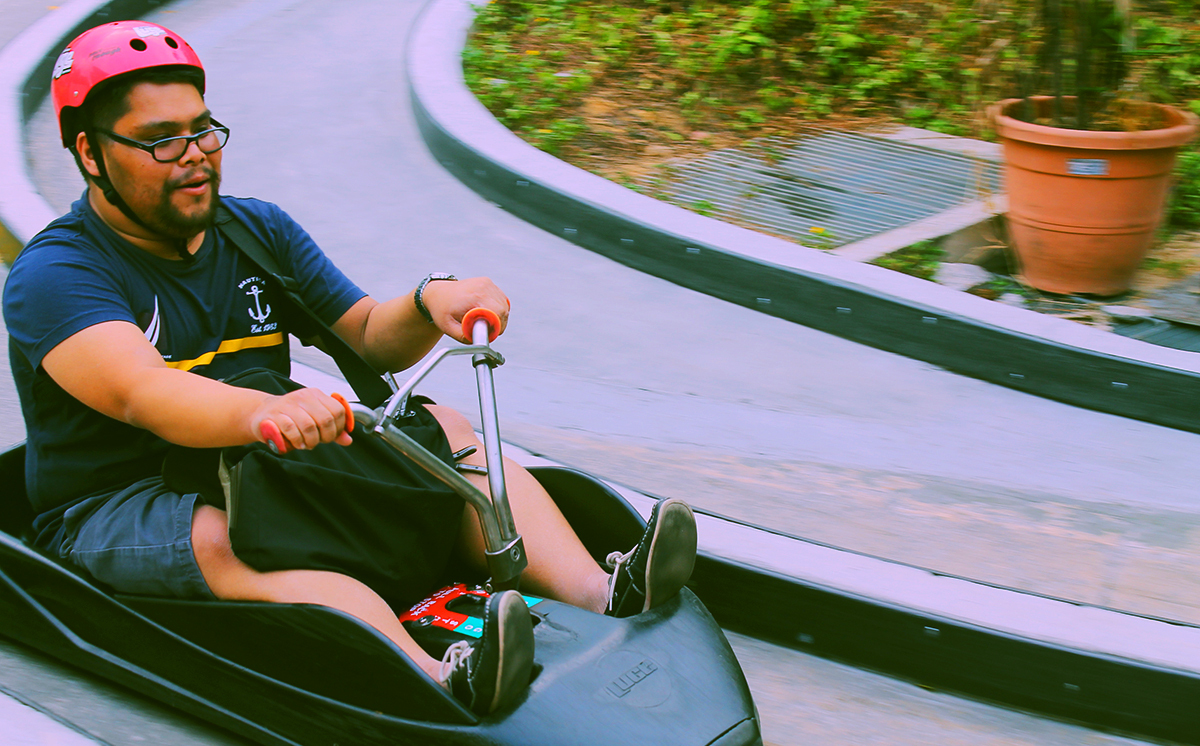
The Sentosa Luge

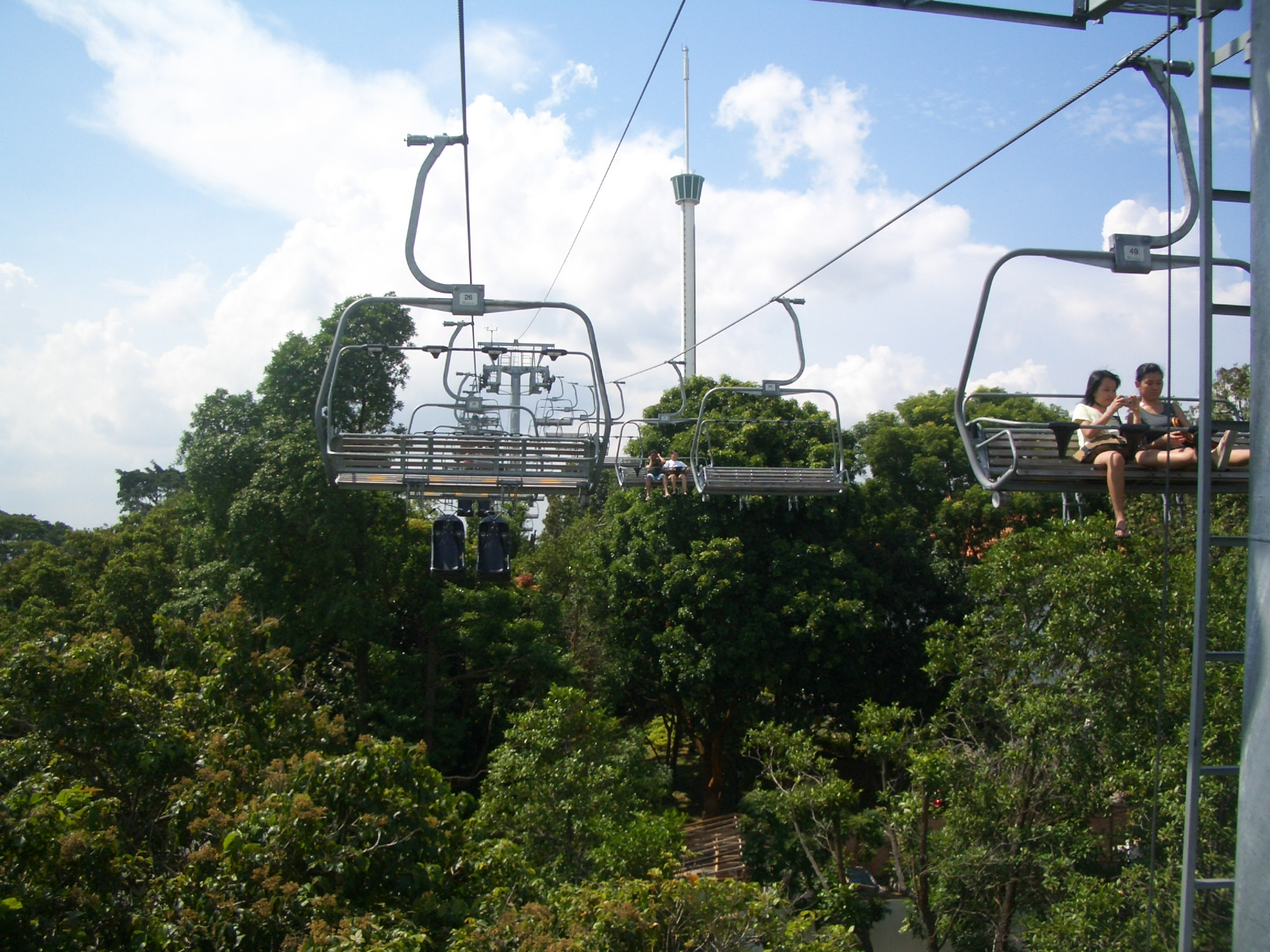
The Skyride

Skyline Luge Singapore is a Luge and Skyride Chairlift system located in Sentosa, Singapore. The attraction opened on 26 August 2005. The luge, situated on the Imbiah Lookout cluster opposite the Tiger Sky Tower, has four tracks. The tracks are called the Jungle Trail (628 metres (2,060 ft)), the Dragon Trail (688 metres (2,257 ft)), the Kupu Kupu Trail (638 meters (2,093 ft)) and the Expedition Trail (658 meters (2159 ft). The Jungle Trail is the oldest, followed by the Dragon Trail and the Kupu Kupu and Expedition trails. The Luge is a self-driving car system in which riders control the speed by pushing a pair of handlebars back and forth. The Luge ride goes downhill, relying on gravitational pull to move. After the ride, the 315 meter long Skyride, using chairlifts, brings riders, Luge carts, and the helmets back to the starting point. The Skyride is similar to a ski lift. There are two Skyride systems available for use.

== See also ==
- List of tourist attractions in Singapore
