= Get Your Sexy Back =

Initiative to promote responsible drinking

The initiative's logo

"Get Your Sexy Back" (GYSB) is a youth-led anti-binge drinking initiative that aims to promote responsible drinking behaviour, by raising the social currency of moderation. The first such initiative in Singapore, the programme was launched in December 2007 and spearheaded by Asia Pacific Breweries (APBS), an Asian Brewery listed on the Singapore Exchange.

A recurring message of the campaign is that consuming 5 or more units of alcohol at a single sitting constitutes binge drinking. This is only one possible definition of binge drinking and other standards have been adopted by anti-binge drinking campaigns in countries like Australia by the National Health and Medical Research Council. In 2008, GYSB released the findings of a survey into the drinking habits of young adults in Singapore aged between 18 and 25. The findings of this survey showed an increasing prevalence of binge drinking among youths, and a greater tendency towards excessive drinking among female drinkers.

== History ==
Get Your Sexy Back was originally conceived by four students from the Nanyang Technological University (NTU), as part of a school project. The students identified several factors responsible for binge drinking among youths in Singapore and approached APBS for support. The programme was subsequently adopted by APBS as part of its corporate social responsibility initiatives in Singapore.

GYSB was first launched in December 2007 with the aim of encouraging responsible drinking behaviour among young adults from 18 – 25 years old by raising the social currency of moderation. The programme engages its target audience through various youth-related activities and platforms, broadly spanning the areas of music, fashion, sports and friendship. GYSB's slogan: “It’s not the drinking, it’s how you’re drinking” was adapted with permission from a New Zealand campaign by the Alcohol Advisory Council of New Zealand (ALAC).

The programme has been present at a number of youth-oriented events, particularly in conjunction with tertiary student associations and national youth bodies. These events include the NTU Surf n Sweat, National Vertical Marathon, the Seventeen magazine Queen of Queens and the Singapore Management University (SMU) Waikiki. In partnering these events, the programme has frequently drawn on support from other corporate partners including Singaporean fashion label NewUrbanMale.com, outdoor media specialists Clear Channel Singapore, as well as convenience chains Cheers and 7-Eleven.

The campaign has also been actively involved in the recruitment of youth volunteers and volunteer ambassadors to pledge their support for the cause of moderate drinking. Recruitment of volunteers has mainly been conducted online via the campaign website, in the various tertiary campuses, as well as at roadshows held at shopping malls.

In February 2010, an article in the TODAY newspaper cited GYSB as an example of a highly successful youth-oriented campaign. The article also stated that more and more youths have been pledging their support for moderate drinking since the launch of GYSB in 2007.

== Platforms ==
The GYSB programme encourages youths to live active, healthy social lives by engaging in activities other than binge drinking. It has grouped these activities into four main youth-oriented platforms.

=== Music ===
To coincide with the relaunch of GYSB on 16 October 2008, singer-songwriter Jillian-Marie Thomas, also a volunteer ambassador, wrote and composed a theme song for the GYSB programme.

GYSB also entered into a collaboration with Sony Music Entertainment, producing a set of GYSB CD inserts which were released together with the launch of the 'Capricorn' album from Taiwanese singer Jay Chou in October 2008.

On 4 April 2009, GYSB staged a concert at The Heeren shopping mall featuring a Singaporean band, "Da Feng Chui". The band, who was an on Channel U's Superband 2008 talent-search, and also launched their debut album in conjunction with the concert dedicating one of the songs on the album to the Get Your Sexy Back campaign.

On 9 December 2009, GYSB staged a music concert in support of responsible drinking at popular nightspot Velvet Underground. The concert featured regional superstar JJ Lin, SuperBand 2008 runners-up Da Feng Chui, Project Superstar alumni Chen Diya and Carrie Yeo, homegrown singer/songwriter Jillian Marie Thomas, and indie-alternative band en(x). All proceeds from the concert were donated to sporting clubs and student associations from Singapore's three main universities. Also announced at the concert were a new range of GYSB T-shirts, designed by local fashionistas, designers and fashion bloggers; and the details of a new membership benefits programme dubbed the GYSB Friends Card.

=== Fashion ===
Singaporean fashion and lifestyle label NewUrbanMale.com (NUM) designed an exclusive range of 'NUMXGYSB' T-shirts in October 2008. The shirts, each bearing the slogan "Two beers or not two beers" were retailed at selected NUM stores island-wide and were designed by NUM founder Shenzi Chua who has likened the slogan to a question on the difficult choices confronting youths when dealing with alcohol.

In December 2009, GYSB launched the third generation of GYSB T-shirts with a collection of three designs by local fashion bloggers Dinnie & Ridhwan, design student Sid Lim and T-shirt printing specialists Ministry of Press.

=== Sports ===
On 18 Oct 2008, GYSB teamed up with Nanyang Technological University (NTU) Sports Club to reach out to students at the NTU Street Challenge, the university's largest annual on-campus sporting event.

GYSB was also supported by the National Vertical Marathon 2009, Singapore Management University (SMU) Surf n Sweat 2009, SMU Waikiki, Freshmen Sports Orientation Camp and Sports Fiesta.

=== Friends ===
In 2007, the student founders of GYSB created a group page on the popular social media platform, Facebook to serve as an avenue where like-minded youths could come together and share their thoughts and experiences on moderate drinking.

In April 2009, a group of National University of Singapore (NUS) students, created and distributed a game via Facebook called "GYSB Matching Fury" as a way of spreading the message of moderate drinking via social networks.

In December 2009, GYSB announced the launch of a membership benefits programme called the GYSB Friends Card. Given away free to programme supporters, the card gives discounts and other privileges at retailers across Singapore. Current commercial partners include Leftfoot, Times the Bookshop and Ministry of Press.

== See also ==
- Alcohol abuse
- Drunkenness
- List of countries by alcohol consumption
