= Magnolia (Fraser and Neave brand) =

Brand owned by Fraser and Neave

- Product type: Dairy products, margarine, non-alcoholic beverages
- Current owner: Fraser and Neave
- Produced by: Fraser and Neave
- Country: Singapore
- Introduced: 1937; 89 years ago
- Markets: Singapore, Malaysia, Thailand
- Tagline: Tasty Goodness In Every Drop
- Website: magnoliaglobal.com; magnolia.com.sg

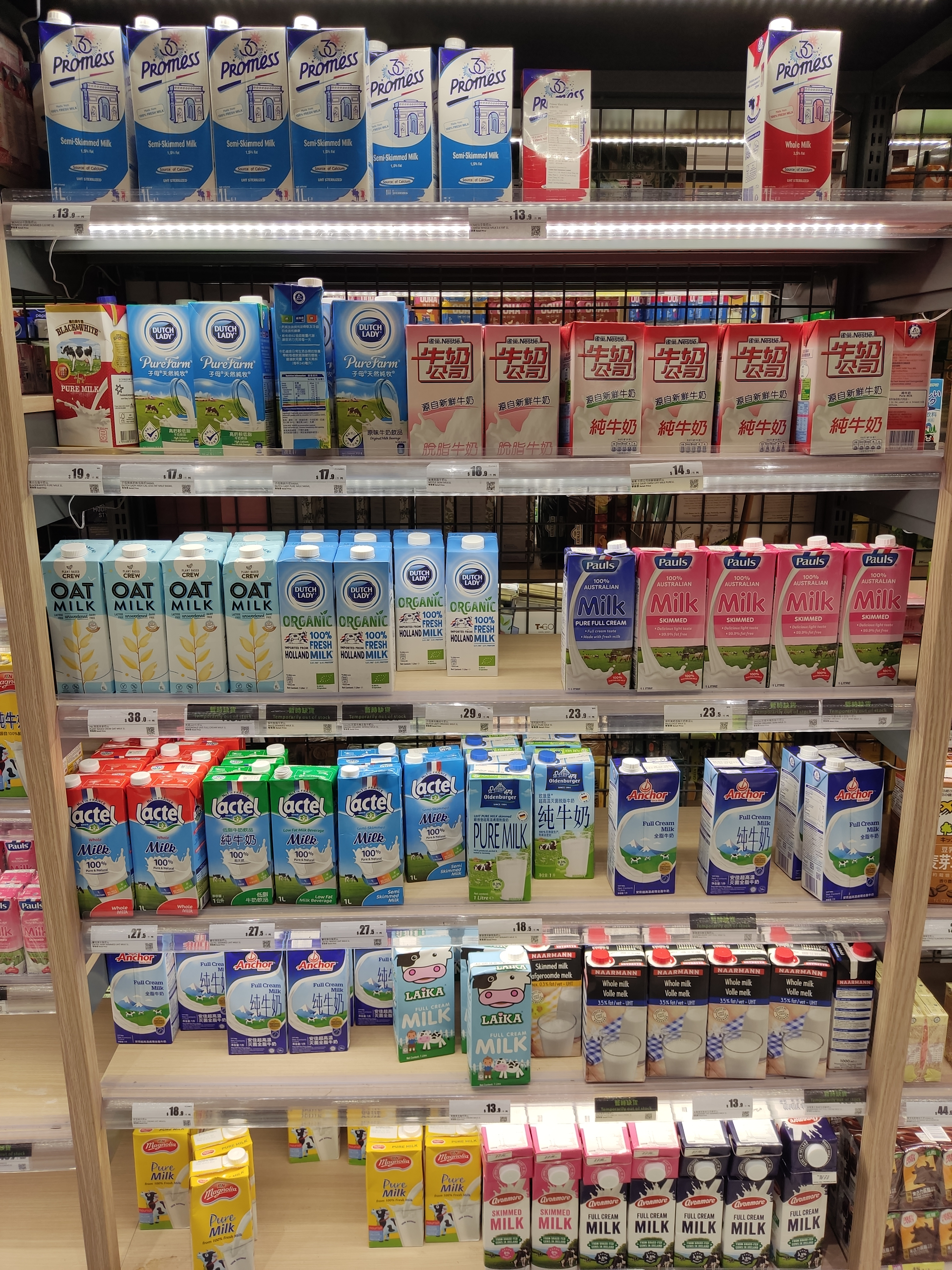
Magnolia milk (yellow cartons in the bottom left corner) at a supermarket in Hong Kong

Magnolia (branded as F&N Magnolia) is a brand of dairy products owned by Singaporean multinational conglomorate Fraser and Neave (F&N). Aside from Singapore, the product is also sold in several other countries throughout the Asia-Pacific as well as at Asian supermarkets in non-Asian countries.

== History ==
=== Early years ===
The Singaporean company Cold Storage, which was then known as the Singapore Cold Storage Company, was the main manufacturer of ice in Singapore. Taking advantage of the booming ice manufacturing and refrigeration business, Cold Storage ventured into the ice cream business. In 1923, a small factory was set up at the Borneo Wharf of the Harbourfront district to manufacture ice cream under the Paradise brand.

=== Tropical dairy farm at Bukit Timah ===
In 1937, Australian Fred Heron, the managing director of Cold Storage, founded the world's first tropical dairy farm at the Bukit Timah district of Singapore, which aimed to produce fresh pasteurised milk. This farm, then known as the Singapore Dairy Farm, was situated inside what is now the Bukit Timah Nature Reserve. It kept as many as 800 cows. Pasteurised milk produced at the farm was packaged in pyramid-shaped cartons and sold under the brand Magnolia.

That same year, a deal was reached between Cold Storage and San Miguel Brewery (now San Miguel Corporation), which owned the successful Magnolia ice cream in the Philippines established in 1925. Cold Storage Creameries Ltd. was founded with an initial capital of $100,000, to which Cold Storage owned the majority 55% and San Miguel owned the balance 45%. San Miguel provided technology for ice cream manufacturing. The success of Cold Storage's ice cream led to a legal battle with San Miguel over the ownership of the Magnolia trademark in Singapore.
