= Oishi Group =

Thai food-and-drink company

Oishi Group Public Company Limited
- Type: Division
- Industry: Food & Beverage
- Founded: 2000
- Founder: Tan Passakornnatee
- Successor: Oishi Green Tea
- Headquarters: Malaysia, Japan
- Area served: Asia Pacific
- Products: Oishi Tea
- Number of employees: 1000+
- Parent: Fraser & Neave Bhd (Malaysia)

Oishi Group Public Company Limited is a food-and-beverage corporate group based in Thailand. It operates chains of Japanese restaurants in Thailand, and produces ready-to-drink tea beverages, mainly under the brand Oishi Green Tea, which are also exported to several international markets. The business was founded as Oishi Restaurant in 2000 by Tan Passakornnatee, and soon branched out to produce green tea drinks, quickly becoming the market leader in Thailand. The company was listed on the Stock Exchange of Thailand as Oishi Group in 2004, and in 2008, was acquired by the Fraser & Neave Bhd Malaysia in 2008.

Currently, Oishi Group has withdrawn its securities from the Stock Exchange of Thailand since 2023, whilst its manufacturing remains in Cambodia.

== Common misconception with Oyoshi Cambodia ==
Oyoshi, a local ready-to-drink green tea brand from Cambodia by FN Beverage Company limited, is commonly mixed up with the Oishi green tea from Oishi group, and Oyoshi green tea, from Fraser & Neave Sdn Bhd in Malaysia. All 3 brands are different with different taste, packaging and origins.

== History ==
Oishi was founded by businessman Tan Passakornnatee, who opened its first all-you-can-eat sushi restaurant on 9 September 1999. Oishi was successful in tapping the rapidly expanding market for Japanese cuisine, which previously only comprised Japanese expatriates and tourists, and opened it up to the middle class. The company was registered as Oishi Restaurant Co., Ltd. on 5 January 2000, and expanded to include several restaurant chains spanning different price ranges over a course of four years. Tan noticed the popularity of the green tea drinks served in its restaurants, and began to produce them as bottled drinks. The move was very successful, and Oishi quickly became the leader in Thailand's emerging green tea market. The company experienced a 2,000-percent rise in net profit in 2004, thanks to the ready-to-drink tea product. It was listed on the Stock Exchange of Thailand as Oishi Group on 3 March that year.

Beginning at the end of 2005, billionaire Charoen Sirivadhanabhakdi moved to acquire a majority stake in Oishi through several holding companies. Tan and his partners sold most of their stake in the company for 3.352 billion baht (US$100M), with Tan staying on as company president. The sale was finalized in 2008, and Charoen's beverage giant ThaiBev came to own a 89.93% stake in Oishi Group.

Tan left Oishi in 2010, and launched his own green-tea drink brand Ichitan in June 2011. Ichitan was heavily marketed using Tan's own public persona and prize campaigns, bringing heavy competition to Oishi, which responded with its own similar campaigns. The two fiercely competed for market leadership over the next few years, with Ichitan overtaking Oishi in sales in 2013 and Oishi regaining the position the following year. The campaigns led to significant expenses cutting into Oishi's profits in 2013, and the company scaled back to refocus on cultivating its brand image and expanding its restaurant business.

The ready-to-drink tea market stagnated and shrank during the latter half of the decade, due in part to health concerns and newly imposed taxes over sugar-sweetened beverages. While Oishi retained its leading market position, it also moved to further diversify its products and expand into international markets.

Oishi began distribution of its drinks in Malaysia and other ASEAN countries in 2013 via Singapore-based Fraser and Neave, which ThaiBev had recently acquired. It had already been established in Laos and Cambodia, where it is the market leader, as well as in Myanmar, Europe, the US and the Middle East. As of 2020, it exports to 33 countries. It also opened restaurants in Myanmar in 2014.

Oishi launched ready-to-cook and ready-to-eat food product lines in 2018, although as of 2020 they still comprised only a small fraction of the company's revenue.

== Businesses ==
Oishi's business is divided into two segments: beverages and food.

In the beverage category, Oishi produces ready-to-drink tea products under three brands: Oishi Green Tea (its main product, with many flavours and varieties), Oishi Gold (its premium brand), and Oishi Chakulza (carbonated green-tea drinks).

The food category consists of Oishi's various restaurant brands, and ready-to-cook and ready-to-eat food products under the Oishi Eato brand.

Oishi operates chain restaurants under the brands Oishi Buffet (all-you-can-eat Japanese restaurant), Oishi Eaterium (atmospheric all-you-can-eat), Shabushi (shabu-shabu), Oishi Ramen (ramen), Kakashi (donburi), Nikuya (yakiniku) Oyoki (Japanese-style soft serve) and Oishi Biztoro (self-service restaurant). It also operates the premium restaurants Oishi Grand (all-you-can eat), Hou Yuu (sushi) and Sakae (shabu-shabu), and provides home delivery via its Oishi Delivery service.
