= 100plus =

Brand of sports drink

100PLUS
- Type: Isotonic sports drink
- Manufacturer: Fraser & Neave Limited (F&N)
- Origin: Singapore
- Introduced: 1983
- Variants: Original, Tangy Tangerine, Lemon Lime, Active, PRO (High Protein), Power Peach
- Website: 100plus.com.my (Malaysia); 100plus.com.sg (Singapore)

100PLUS (often pronounced as "hundred plus") is a brand of isotonic sports drink manufactured by Fraser and Neave. It was created and launched in 1983 in both Malaysia and Singapore, with the name commemorating 100 years of Fraser and Neave's founding.

== Production ==
100PLUS is popular in both Malaysia and Singapore. It has been consistently voted the number one isotonic drink brand in Malaysia and Singapore in various surveys since its introduction in 1983. One of its main competitors in Singapore is H-TWO-O, which is manufactured by Yeo Hiap Seng.

Four flavours are available– original, Tangy Tangerine, Lemon Lime, Berries and Active. In 2017, a non-carbonated version called 100PLUS Active was introduced.

100PLUS is sold in Malaysia, Singapore, Brunei, Thailand, Indonesia, Vietnam, the Philippines, Cambodia, Laos, Myanmar, Canada, Papua New Guinea, Maldives, India, Sri Lanka, South Korea, China, Taiwan and South Africa. In Canada, 100PLUS is sold at T&T Supermarkets in British Columbia, Alberta and Ontario. The authorised distributor for Canada is Palm Resources Inc. It is sometimes available in other parts of the world, such as Australia in Coles/Woolworths Supermarkets and Asian stores. It can also be seen in Asian shops in the UK.

After 7 years being in the Sri Lankan market through partnership between F&N and Browns Pharmaceuticals Ltd since 2018, 100PLUS was relaunched in the country through Bolt Distribution, a member of the Sri Lankan Thakral Group in 2024 to further enhance its presence.

== Marketing ==
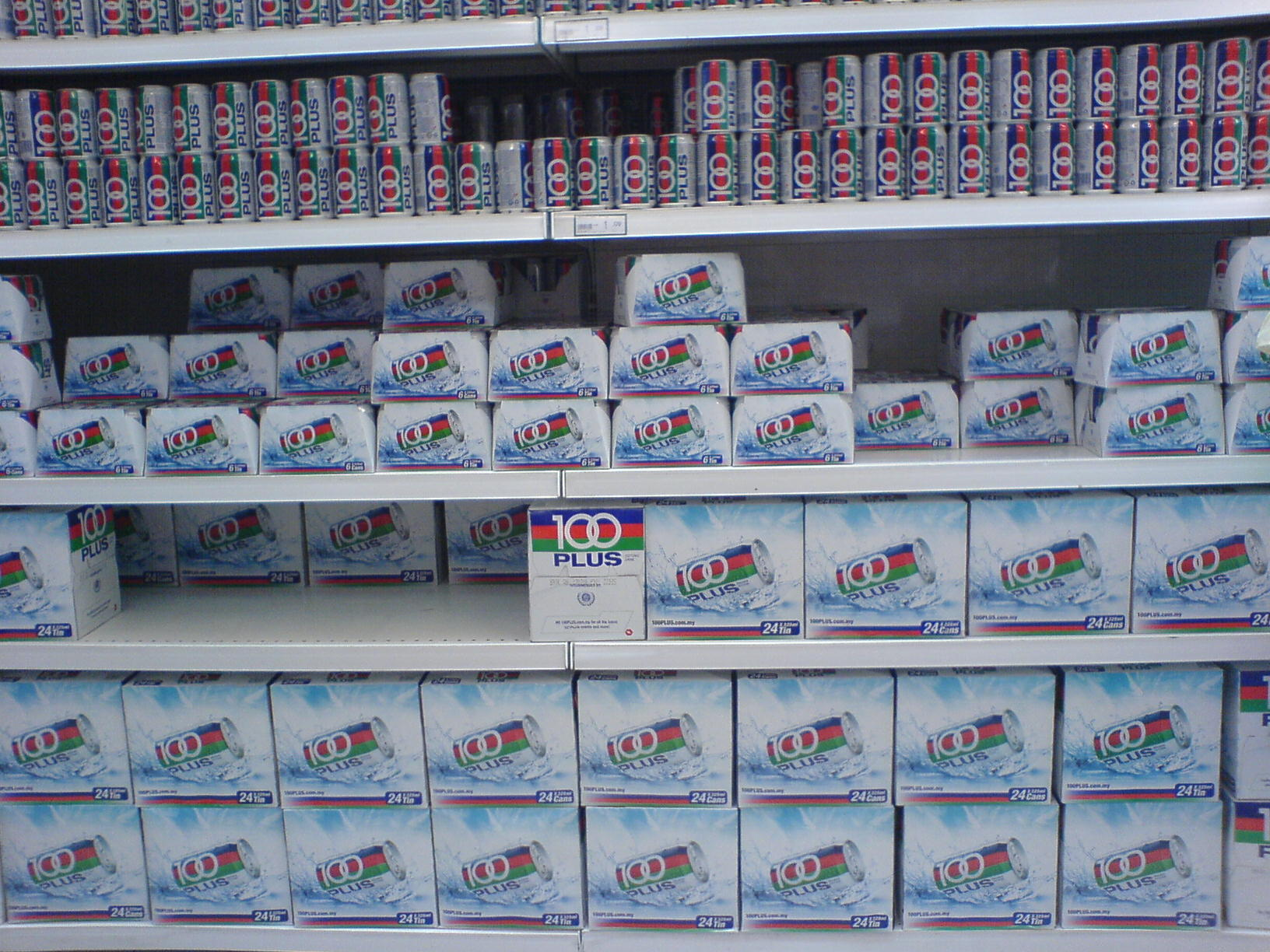
Boxes of 100PLUS stacked up at a Giant Hypermarket in Kuala Lumpur, Malaysia.

100PLUS is the only drink endorsed by the National Sports Council of Malaysia. Its brand ambassador is Lee Chong Wei, a Malaysian Olympic silver medallist in badminton. Other athletes sponsored by 100PLUS include Malaysian sprinter Khairul Hafiz Jantan and Singaporean marathoner Mok Ying Ren.

Fraser and Neave Holdings Bhd (F&N) signed a strategic beverage distribution agreement with AirAsia in 2010 in its bid to grow the 100PLUS brand further by offering the drink for onboard sale.

Since 2013, 100PLUS has been the sponsor of Myanmar Football Federation and Myanmar National League. The sponsorship is extended to 2020 to support major football events in the country, the various football teams within the national setup, football tournaments for youth development and the local professional competitions.

F&N announced in 2013 the rebranding of 100PLUS.

From 2016, 100PLUS is the title sponsor of Malaysia's second-tier football competition, the Malaysia Premier League as well become synonymously known as the sponsor for various Malaysian sports. 100PLUS also sponsors the 2017 Southeast Asian Games and 2017 ASEAN Para Games, which were held in Kuala Lumpur. In 2018, 100PLUS become one of the official partners sponsor of 2018 AFF Championship, the Southeast Asian regional football championship tournament.

100PLUS is also the active sponsor for LPL Cricket and the Royal College Rugby team of Sri Lanka.

== Ingredients ==
100PLUS contains carbonated water, sucrose, glucose, citric acid, sodium citrate, sodium chloride, potassium phosphate, flavourings, sodium benzoate and calcium phosphate. It contains ingredients like sodium, minerals and electrolytes which is similar to that in the human body to help maintain the body's pH level. It's not known in what proportion or quantity these ingredients are represented.

In 2018, 100PLUS was "reformulated to contain 6g or less sugar per 100ml, and now carry the Healthier Choice Logo (HCL) from the Health Ministry."
