= Tan Passakornnatee =

Thai businessman

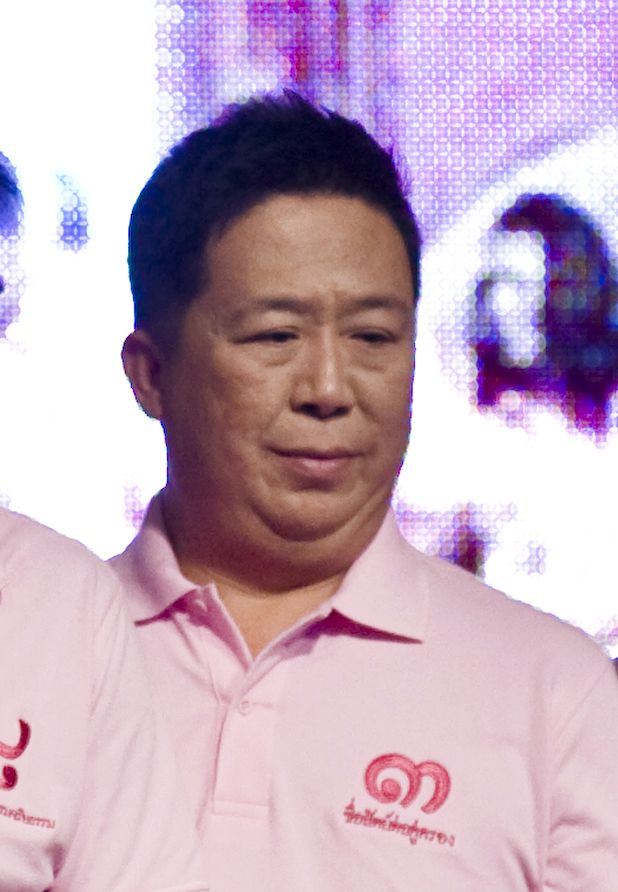
- Born: April 4, 1959 (age 67); Chonburi, Thailand
- Occupation: Businessman
- Known for: Founder Oishi Group, Ichitan Company and Double Drink Company
- Spouse: Eng Passakornnatee
- Children: Get Passakornnatee; Gaigai Passakornnatee; Varisa Passakornatee

Tan Passakornnatee (Thai: ตัน ภาสกรนที; born April 4, 1959) is a Thai businessman, best known as the founder of the Oishi Group of Japanese restaurants. The product that made him successful and well known in Thailand is Oishi Green Tea.

== Biography ==
Tan Passakornnatee was born in Chonburi at Thailand. His parents are Chinese, so he is both Thai and Chinese. He graduated at Grade 9 and got his first job as an employee at Sahapat. Then he saved money from his first job, and he opened a bookstall in Chonburi. Also, he started to invest his money in property. In 1999, he founded the Oishi Restaurants, WBC (Wedding Business Consultant) Wedding Studio and Oishi Green Tea. Next, in 2010 he resigned from the Oishi Group, and he founded a new company named Mai Tan that is composed of Ichitan Company and Double Drink Company.

Tan Passakornnatee is the CEO of Mai Tan Company. He is engaged to Eng Passakornnatee, who is known as Sunisa. He has three children named Gaigai, Gift, and Get.
