= Ichitan =

Thai beverage company

Ichitan Group Co., Ltd
- ISIN: TH5048010000
- Industry: Food processing and packaged foods
- Founded: 2010 in Bangkok, Thailand
- Founder: Tan Passakornnatee
- Headquarters: Bangkok, Thailand
- Products: Ichitan Greentea
- Website: www.ichitangroup.com

Ichitan Group Co., Ltd. is a Thai beverage company that manufactures green tea drinks, herbal drinks, fruit drinks, and energy drinks.

== History ==
Ichitan company was founded by Tan Passakornatee who was the original founder of Oishi Group. Ichitan company incorporated the company on the third of September 2010. Later, the company registered capital for 1,300 million baht and a paid up capital of 1,300 million baht into ordinary shares on December 31, 2015. On August 27, 2014, Mitsubishi Corporation and PT Sigmantara Alfindo have entered into a joint venture which aims to produce and sell Ichitan drinks in Indonesia.

On August 24, 2022, Philippine snack food company Rebisco has entered the beverage market for the exclusive distributor of Ichitan in the Philippines.

In January 2023, the famous Thai actor, singer, model, host and entrepreneur Vachirawit Chivaaree became the Brand Ambassador of Ichitan.

== Products ==
- Ichitan Greentea is the main seller of Ichitan company which consists of 7 flavors: Original, Honey Lemon, Genmaicha, Chrysanthemum, Lychee, Sugar Free, and Oolong Sugar Free. Ichitan Greentea also includes 4 packages: 420 ml, 600 ml, 840 ml, and UHT 300 ml. All Ichitan's tea is made with organic tea plants.
- Ichitan Chew Chew is tea with Nata de coco that comes with 3 flavors: Kyoho Grape, Strawberry, and Lychee.
- Dragon Black Tea is made from black tea and it has 3 flavors: Mulberry, Apple, and Lemon.
- Yen Yen Cool Herb Tea is Ichitan's first herbal beverage which is a mixture of 7 chinese herbs. The herbs are jiaogulan, grassjelly, mulberry, luo han guo, chrysanthemum, safflower flower, and bael.
