= Tiger Beer =

Singaporean brand of beer

Tiger
- Logo of Tiger Beer
- Manufacturer: Heineken Asia Pacific; Fraser and Neave
- Origin: Singapore
- Introduced: 1932; 94 years ago
- Alcohol by volume: 5% pilsner
- Style: Lager
- Website: www.tigerbeer.com

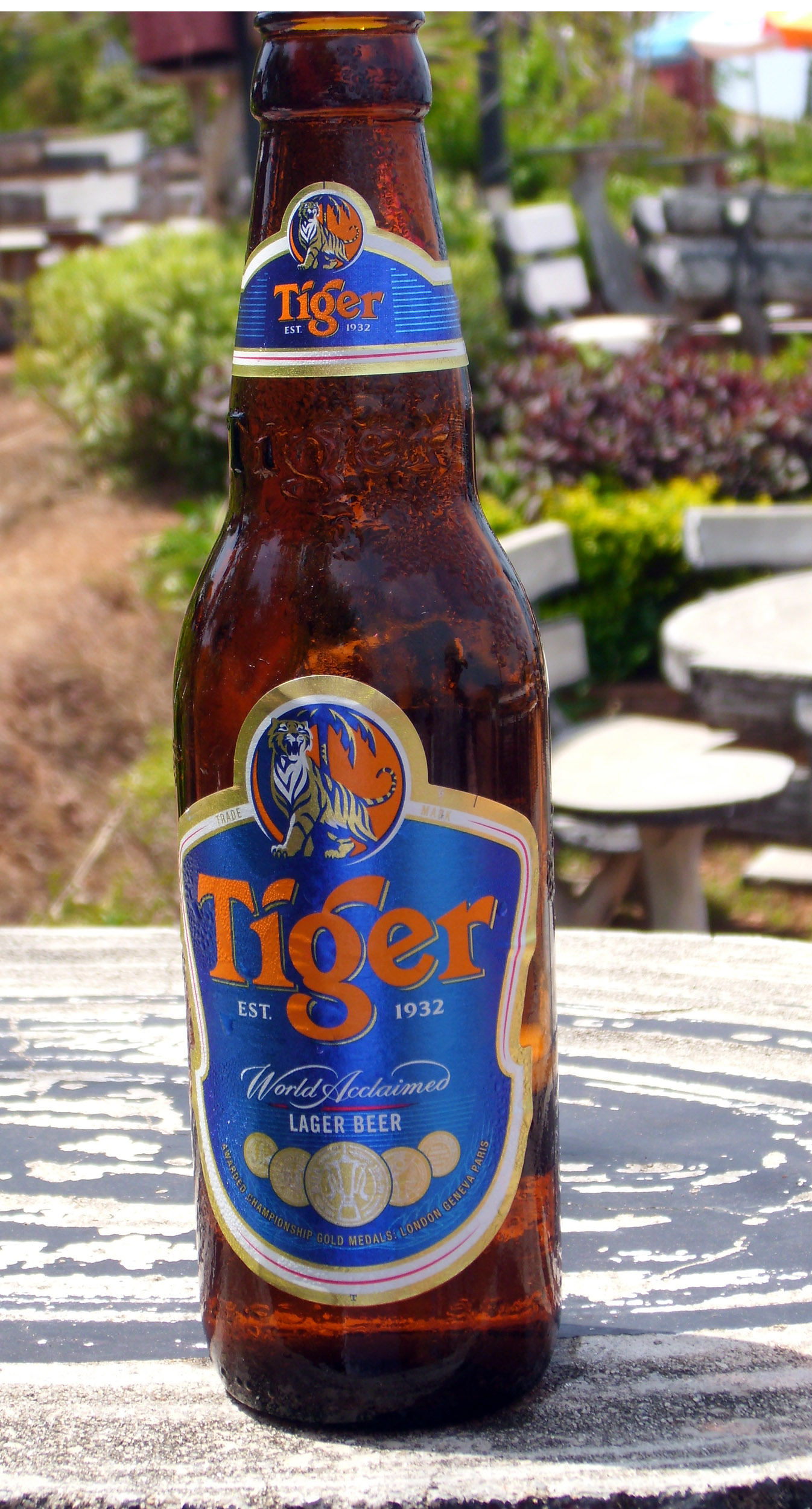
330ml bottle of Tiger Beer

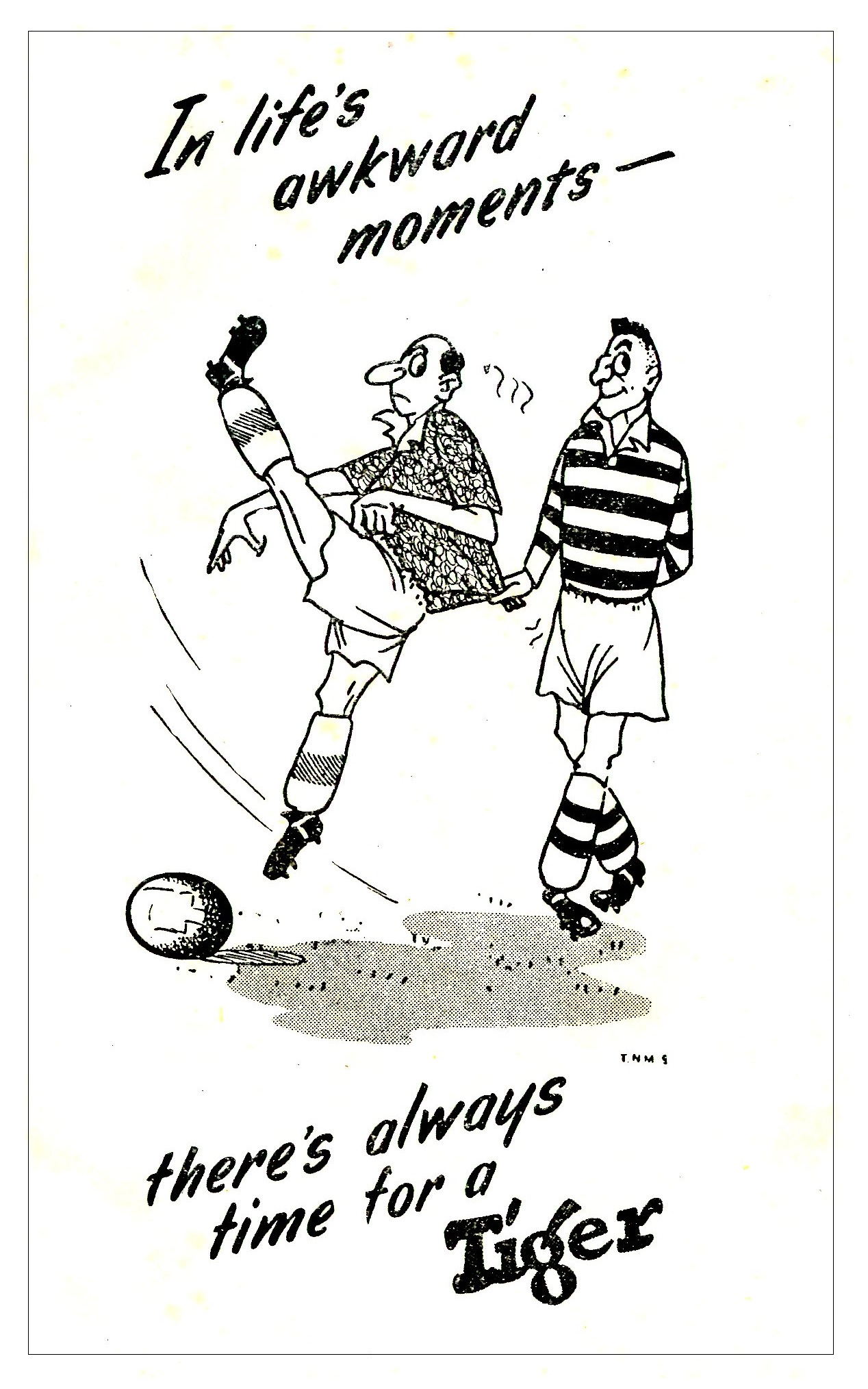
Advert for Tiger Beer in a Singapore Amateur Football Association's handbook in 1952

Tiger Beer is a Singaporean brand of beer first launched in 1932. It is currently produced by Heineken Asia Pacific, formerly known as Asia Pacific Breweries. The company is a joint venture between Heineken N.V. and Singaporean multinational food and beverage company Fraser and Neave.

The Tiger Brewery Tour is a tourist attraction located in the Tuas district of the country, which offers guided visits as to how the beer is brewed. According to a Brand Finance report, Tiger is among Singapore's 10 most valuable brands.

== Beers ==
Launched in 1932, Tiger beer became Singapore's first locally brewed beer. It is a 5% abv bottled pale lager. Heineken Asia Pacific's flagship brand, is available in more than 60 countries worldwide.

=== Products ===
The brewery currently produces several brands of beer.

- Tiger Beer
- Tiger Crystal
- Tiger White
- Tiger Black
- Tiger Radler (Lemon, Grapefruit, Mandarin and Honey, Pomelo)
- Tiger platinum
- Tiger Soju (Plum, Green Grape)

== Marketing ==
The "It's Time for a Tiger" slogan for Tiger Beer has run for decades since its inception in the 1930s.

The writer Anthony Burgess named his first novel Time for a Tiger (the first part of the Malayan trilogy The Long Day Wanes) as the beer was popular in Malaya in the 1950s, where Burgess was working.

Burgess reveals in his autobiography that, when his Time for a Tiger was published, he asked the manufacturer, then Fraser and Neave, for a complimentary clock with the Tiger beer slogan. The brewery declined to offer this or any other gift to him. But, fourteen years later, when Burgess was more famous, it relented. In 1970, the company offered Burgess the privilege to consume any of their beers free of charge while in Singapore. However, in his own words, Burgess wrote in response: "But it was too late, I had become wholly a gin man."

The Tiger Sky Tower operated in Sentosa until 2018.

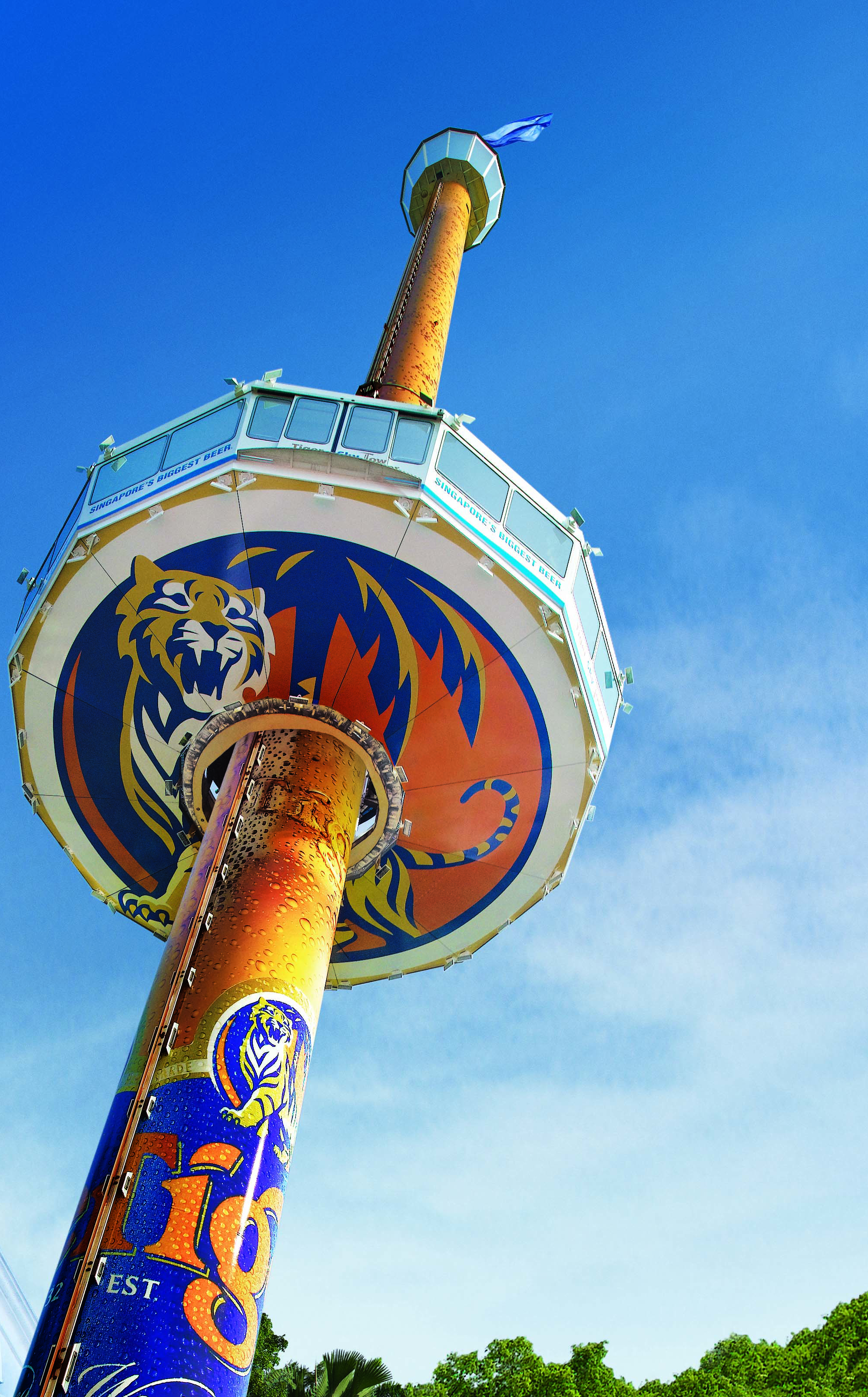
Tiger Sky Tower

== Awards ==
Tiger Beer has entered several beer-tasting competitions and has performed well. At the 2011 World Quality Selections, organised by Monde Selection, the brand won a Gold Quality award.

== Tiger in popular culture ==
=== Film ===
The beer was also seen in the 2002 movie The Transporter with Jason Statham. Crates of Tiger appeared in the 2008 film Tropic Thunder. Also, in the 2001 Hong Kong action thriller The Accidental Spy, it's the preferred beer of Buck Yuen (played by Jackie Chan) who orders it by name in a bar and, also, has an empty bottle of Tiger by his bed in the next scene as he wakes up from a dream.

In the movie The Odd Angry Shot about the Australian Special Air Service during the Vietnam War, Tiger is considered the beer of choice among American and Aussie troops. Tiger is seen as a favourite among British troops during the Malayan Emergency in the film The Virgin Soldiers.

=== Music ===
In Vietnam, Tiger Beer regularly organizes music events. The first event took place in 2007 at tigermusic.com.vn. The event takes place every year.

- Tiger remix 2017 in Vietnam
- Tiger remix 2018 in Vietnam
- Tiger remix 2019 in Vietnam
- Tiger remix 2020 in Vietnam

=== Television ===
In the Disney+ series, The Falcon and the Winter Soldier, Bucky Barnes / The Winter Soldier, played by Sebastian Stan can be seen drinking one bottle of Tiger Beer in the premiere episode.
