= Archipelago Brewery =

Beverage company in Singapore

- Industry: Alcoholic beverage
- Founded: 4 November 1933; 92 years ago 24 July 2006; 19 years ago (re-commissioned) in Singapore
- Defunct: 30 June 2024; 23 months ago
- Headquarters: 459 Jalan Ahmad Ibrahim, Singapore
- Products: Beer
- Production output: 400,000 litres per annum
- Owner: Heineken Asia Pacific
- Website: archipelagobrewery.com

The Archipelago Brewery was a Singaporean brewery owned by Heineken Asia Pacific (formerly Asia Pacific Breweries). It labelled itself as "Singapore's Craft Brewery".

== History ==
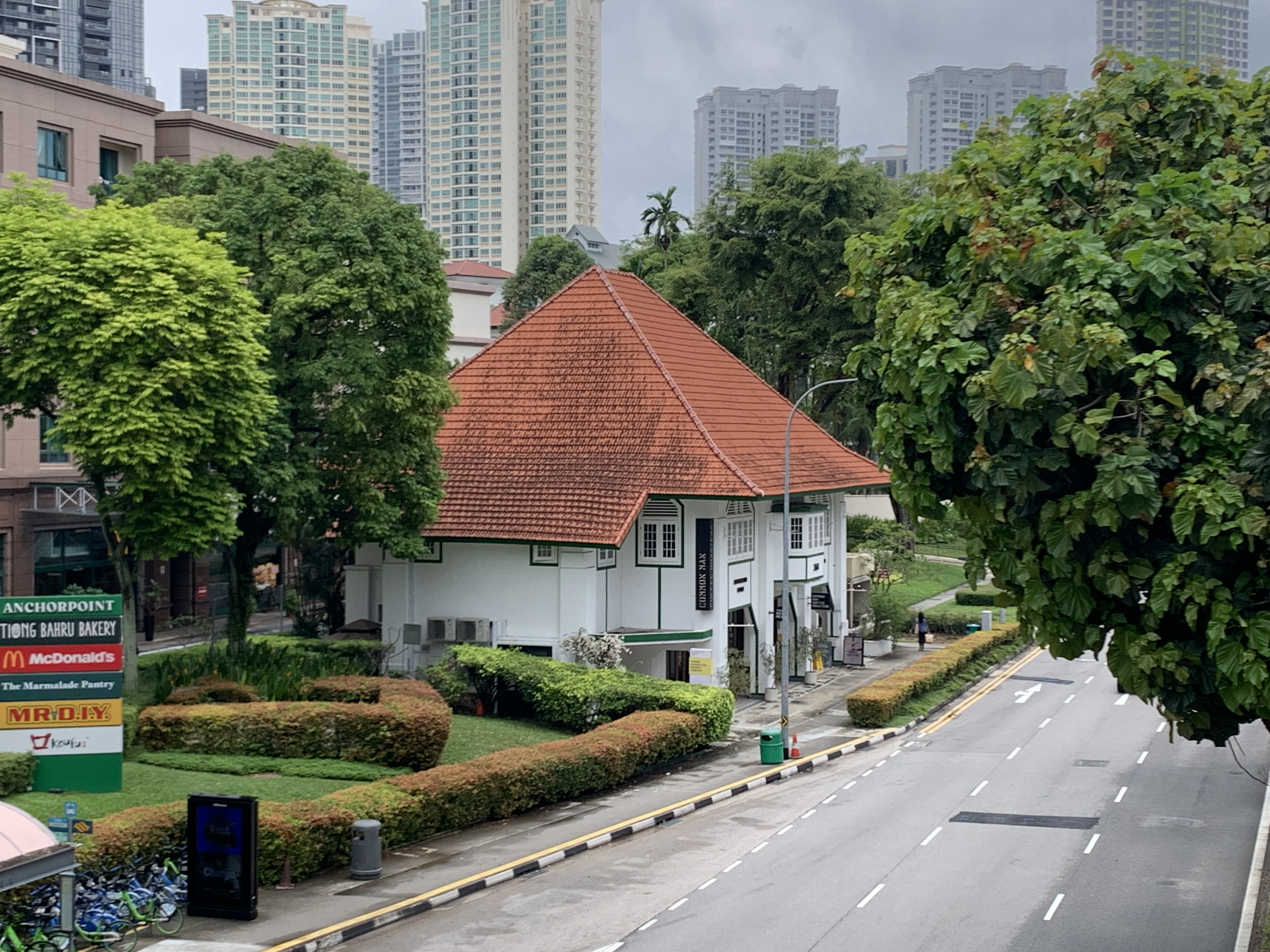
The former Archipelago Brewery Company building on Alexandra Road

In August 1931, with a capital of 5,250,000 guilders N.V. Archipel Brouwerij Compagnie (Archipelago Brewery Co.) was formed in Batavia (now known as Jakarta). The board was formed by the firm, Geo Wehry and Co. This company imported all by Beck brewery in Bremen to brew Koentji (key) beer. The first brewery was built in Batavia, it was made of steel framing, something in the Dutch Indies virtually not been done before. Wehry was a trading company, which started out in trading tobacco. Wehry was later merged with Borsumij and then merged into the still existing Hagemeyer that time in the Dutch East Indies was established.

Archipelago opened a brewery on Alexandra Road in Singapore on 4 November 1933, in art-deco buildings designed by Hienrich Rudolf Arbenz, where it produced Anchor Beer.

During World War II, the British deemed the brewery to be enemy territory due to its German ties and seized it in 1941. It was then bought by Malayan Breweries Ltd, which in 1990 was renamed Asia Pacific Breweries. In 2013, Asia Pacific Breweries merged to become Heineken Asia Pacific.

Archipelago Brewery is currently Heineken Asia Pacific's craft brewing arm. The old Archipelago Brewery was re-commissioned on 24 July 2006, with international brewmaster, Fal Allen. Three variants of the Archipelago craft beers, namely Traveller's Wheat, Straits Pale and Traders Brown Ale were launched at Archipelago's flagship pub located on Circular Road in Singapore (now closed).

The re-launch of Archipelago was consistent with Heineken Asia Pacific's objectives to add a new dimension to Singapore's beer industry; and to continue to grow its presence and stature locally.

Archipelago Brewery produced boutique beers in small batches. In 2016, Archipelago Brewery brewed and sold 390,000 litres of beer. The Archipelago Brewery currently produces six permanent beers: Tropical Pale Ale, Singapore Blonde Ale, Belgian Wit, Summer IPA, Bohemian Lager and Irish Ale, in addition to limited edition or specialty beers.

In May 2024, Heineken Asia Pacific announced it would be closing the brewery at the end of June that year.

== Specialty Brews ==
The brewery created speciality brews which were sold as limited-release products, produced in much smaller quantities than the regular brews. Previous speciality brews included:

- Anderson Valley Brewing collaboration Pale Ale – Fresh seedless red Californian grapes were squeezed and added to boil in the last 5 minutes, along with Nelson Sauvin and Pacifica hops to give it a subtle orange and gooseberry hop aroma. After a week of cold conditioning, the beer was flushed into a separate tank containing dry hopping bags full of freshly cut and sterilised passion fruit. ABV 4.6%, Bitterness 32 IBU, Colour 25EBC
- 1925 Archi Mango IPA collaboration – Various hops were used in the boil and whirlpool to give it flavours of grapefruit, orange and passion fruit. Fresh Mango was added on the 4-day of fermentation along with generous amounts of Centennial hops to give it herbal lemon citrus aromas. ABV – 5.55% Bitterness – 45 IBU.
- Renku Lager – Dry hopped with Challenger (UK) and a dash of Japanese green tea which provides a clean fresh aroma of evergreen, wood and green tea tones.
- HOPSALE – American Pale Ale with 8 types of hops added throughout different stages of the brew. 5% ABV
- COCO's Cream – Nitrogen saturated smooth pour cream ale made with a large amount of cooking chocolate. 4.2% ABV

== Awards ==
Year	Organiser	Winning Variant	Award	Category
2008	Brew NZ	Samui	Silver	Fruit/Spiced/Herb/Flavoured Beer, Fruit and Vegetable
2008	Brew NZ	Explorer	Silver	French and Belgian Style Ales, French-Belgian Style Saison
2010	World Beer Cup	Straits Pale	Silver	International Pale Ale
2011	The Brewing Industry International Awards	Belgian Wit	Bronze	Wheat Beer
2011	Australian International Beer Awards	Belgian Wit	Silver	Witbier Style
2011	Australian International Beer Awards	Irish Ale	Silver	British Style Pale Ale
2011	Australian International Beer Awards	Summer Ale	Bronze	British Style Pale Ale
2011	International Brewing Awards	Hickory Smoked IPA	Bronze	Specialty
2011	Brew NZ	Bohemian Lager	Silver	International Lager Styles
2011	Brew NZ	Irish Ale	Gold	British Ale Styles
2011	NZ	Summer Ale	Silver	British Ale Styles
2011	Brew NZ	Belgian Wit	Bronze	Wheat & Other Grain Styles
2011	Japanese Beer Awards	Irish Ale	Silver	Irish Ales category, only medal in the category
2011	Japanese Beer Awards	Bohemian Lager	Silver	International Lager Styles, only medal in the category
2011	Japanese Beer Awards	Summer Ale	Bronze	English Style Summer Ales, only medal in the category
2012	Australian International Beer Awards	Summer Ale	Bronze	English Summer Ale
2012	Australian International Beer Awards	Irish Ale	Bronze	American Styly Red Draught
2012	Australian International Beer Awards	Belgian Wit	Silver	Belgian Wit Draught
2012	International Beer Challenge UK	Bohemian Lager	Silver	Lager
2012	International Beer Challenge UK	Irish Ale	Bronze	Ales
2012	International Beer Challenge UK	Sake Sorachi	Bronze	Specialty
2012	Brewers Guild Awards NZ	Belgian Wit	Gold	Wheat & Other Grain Styles
2012	Japan International Beer Award	Bohemian Lager	Gold	International – Style Lager
2012	Japan International Beer Award	Summer Ale	Bronze	English Style – Summer Ale
2012	Japan International Beer Award	Belgian Wit	Bronze	Belgian-Style Witbier
2014	Japan International Beer Award	English Bitter	Silver	Ordinary Bitter
2014	Japan International Beer Award	Belgian Wit	Bronze	Belgian-Style Witbier
2016	BeerFest Asia Singapore	Belgian Wit	Gold	Belgian-Style Witbier
2016	BeerFest Asia Singapore	Blemished Flemish Saison	Silver	Saison – Farmhouse
