= Clementi =

Clementi may refer to:

== People ==
- Aldo Clementi (1925–2011), Italian composer
- Carlo Mazzone-Clementi (1920–2000), Italian actor and mime
- Cecil Clementi (1875–1947), British colonial administrator, Governor of Hong Kong and Straits Settlements
- Cecilia Clementi, Italian-American scientist
- Cresswell Clementi (1918–1981), senior Royal Air Force commander
- David Clementi (born 1949), British business executive, deputy governor of the Bank of England, and chairman of the BBC
- Enrico Clementi (1931–2021), Italian computational chemist
- Muzio Clementi (1752–1832), Italian/English composer
- Rich Clementi (born 1977), American mixed martial artist
- Suicide of Tyler Clementi, 2010 incident in which a college student committed suicide after his sexual encounter with another man was video-streamed over the internet

== Other ==
- Clementi, Singapore, a neighbourhood of Singapore
- Clementi MRT station, Singapore
- Clementi Police Division, a police division of the Singapore Police Force
- Clementi Public Library, a public library in Singapore
- Clementi Town Secondary School, a secondary school in Singapore
- Clementi Secondary School, a secondary school in North Point, Hong Kong
- Tyler Clementi Foundation, a anti-bullying non-profit organization
