= 2024 East–West Line disruption =

Transit disruption in Singapore

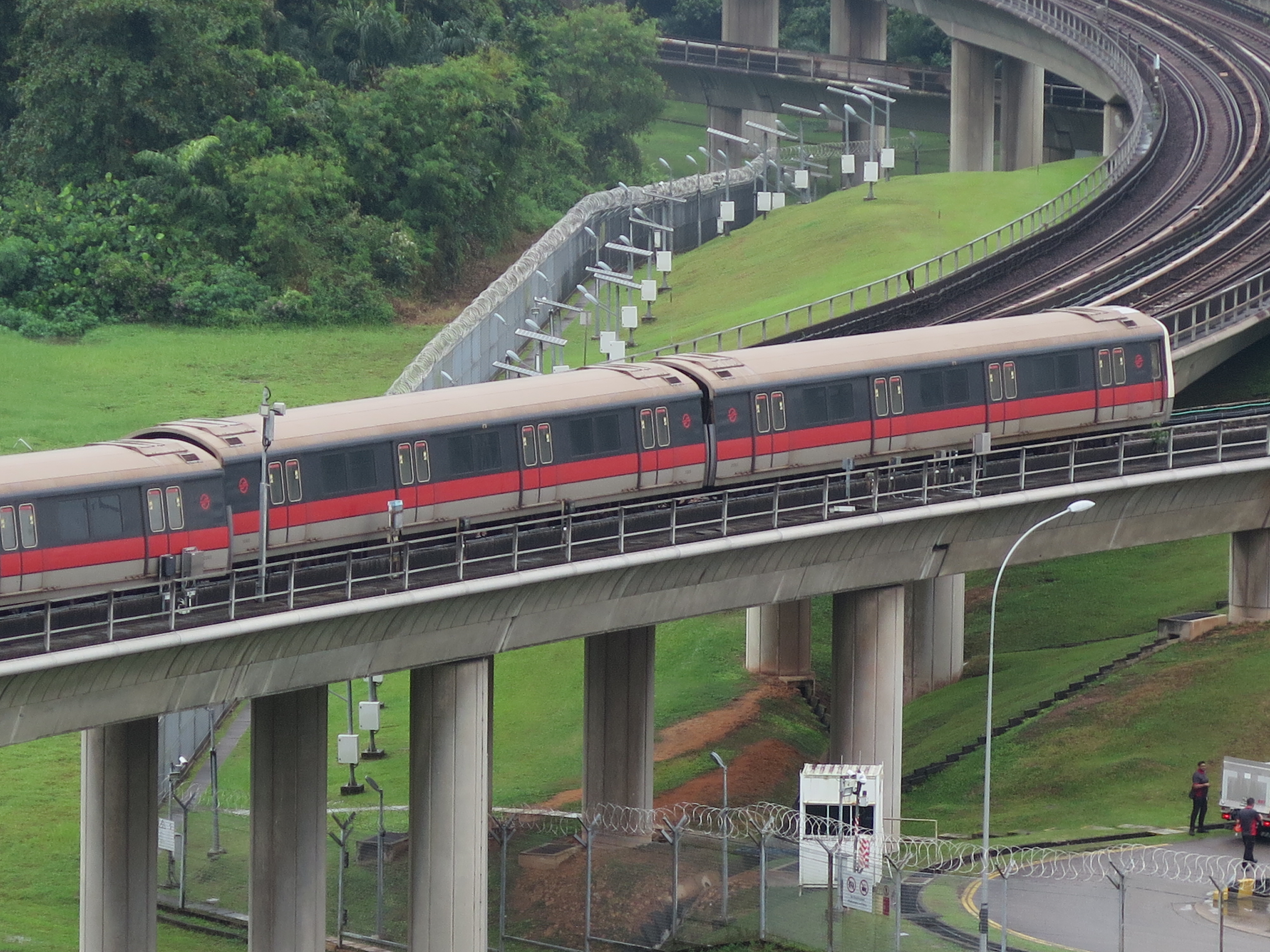
- The derailed Kawasaki C151 train on the tracks towards Ulu Pandan Depot

Details
- Date: 25 September 2024; 2 years ago approximately 9:25 a.m. (SST)
- Location: Clementi MRT station to Ulu Pandan Depot reception track 1.6 km (0.99 mi)
- Coordinates: 1°19′29″N 103°45′36″E
- Country: Singapore
- Line: East–West Line
- Operator: SMRT Trains
- Owner: Land Transport Authority
- Incident type: Train car derailment, mechanical failures leading to extensive track damage
- Cause: Dislodged axle box of train

Statistics
- Trains: Kawasaki Heavy Industries C151
- Deaths: 0
- Injured: 0
- Damage: S$10 million
Area of disruption

On 25 September 2024, train services on the East–West Line (EWL) of the Singapore Mass Rapid Transit (MRT) system were disrupted when an axle box on a Kawasaki C151 train dislodged, derailing the train and damaging the track and equipment between Clementi and Dover stations. This resulted in the suspension of regular services between Boon Lay and Queenstown stations, affecting more than 2 million commuters.

The damage was extensive, and services were not restored for several days. During restoration works by engineers from the Land Transport Authority (LTA) and SMRT Corporation, shuttle train services were restored between Queenstown and Buona Vista stations, and between Jurong East and Boon Lay stations. Bus-bridging services were provided for the closed segment between Buona Vista and Jurong East stations. Full services on the EWL resumed on 1 October.

This was the worst breakdown in the MRT network's history. Investigations began on 2 October, and the LTA and the Transport Safety Investigation Bureau (TSIB) released separate findings on 3 June 2025. The LTA report concluded the failure began with degraded grease in an axle bearing, which caused overheating and fire damage to the chevron springs. This led to the detachment of the axle box and the train's derailment near Dover station. The TSIB report added that repairing a "Null ID" error in the software for SMRT's Hot Axle Box Detection System could have identified the affected train and prevented the incident. SMRT was subsequently fined S$2.4 million (US$1.8 million) (Note: All currencies are in their 2024 values and are converted to United States dollars using data from the International Monetary Fund published by the World Bank.) and the Kawasaki C151 trains were withdrawn from revenue service by September 2025.

== Background ==
The Singapore Mass Rapid Transit (MRT) network began operations in 1987, and the stretch between Outram Park station and Clementi station opened on 12 March 1988. The East–West Line (EWL) is operated by SMRT Trains. The first-generation trains (Note: Also known as Kawasaki Heavy Industries C151.) had been running on the EWL and the North–South Line (NSL) since services began, and had an expected service life of 38 years.

Previous disruptions on the MRT network include the Clementi rail accident on 5 August 1993, when an oil spill on the tracks caused two trains to collide at Clementi station, injuring 156 people. On 13 April 1999, a train near Toa Payoh station derailed due to an error in track alignments. A power outage at Buona Vista station led to service disruptions on the EWL, NSL and the Circle Line (CCL) on 25 April 2016. In November 2017, a software error in the EWL signalling system caused the Joo Koon rail accident, in which two trains collided at Joo Koon station. Twenty-eight people, including two SMRT staff members, were injured in the collision. Another power outage on the EWL, NSL and CCL occurred in October 2020.

== Incident ==
At about 9:00 a.m. Singapore Time on 25 September 2024, a faulty eastbound Kawasaki C151 train (T310) was pulled out of service at Clementi station. Eyewitnesses reported smoke emitting from the train as it arrived at the station. To return to Ulu Pandan Depot, the T310 train switched over at Queenstown station. When the train was travelling westward near Dover station, a defective axle box dropped onto the tracks, causing the bogie frame to dislodge from the third car of the six-car train. The dislodged bogie caused "extensive damage" to the affected track stretch, triggering a power outage at 9:25 a.m. that stalled the train. The incident caused 46 rail breaks across 2.55 kilometres (1.58 mi) (Note: Initially reported as 1.6 kilometres (0.99 mi).) of track, and damaged the third rail, power cables, rail fasteners and point machines that enable trains to change tracks.

The accident also stalled four trains between Clementi and Buona Vista, including one that was 40 metres (130 ft) from Clementi station. Passengers from that stalled train disembarked and walked to Clementi station with SMRT staff guidance. The train operator, SMRT Trains, reported the incident at 9:52 a.m., and suspended train services between Queenstown and Boon Lay stations. At 2:45 p.m., the LTA announced there would be no train services between Boon Lay and Queenstown for the rest of that day because of "extensive damage".

== Repair and mitigation works ==
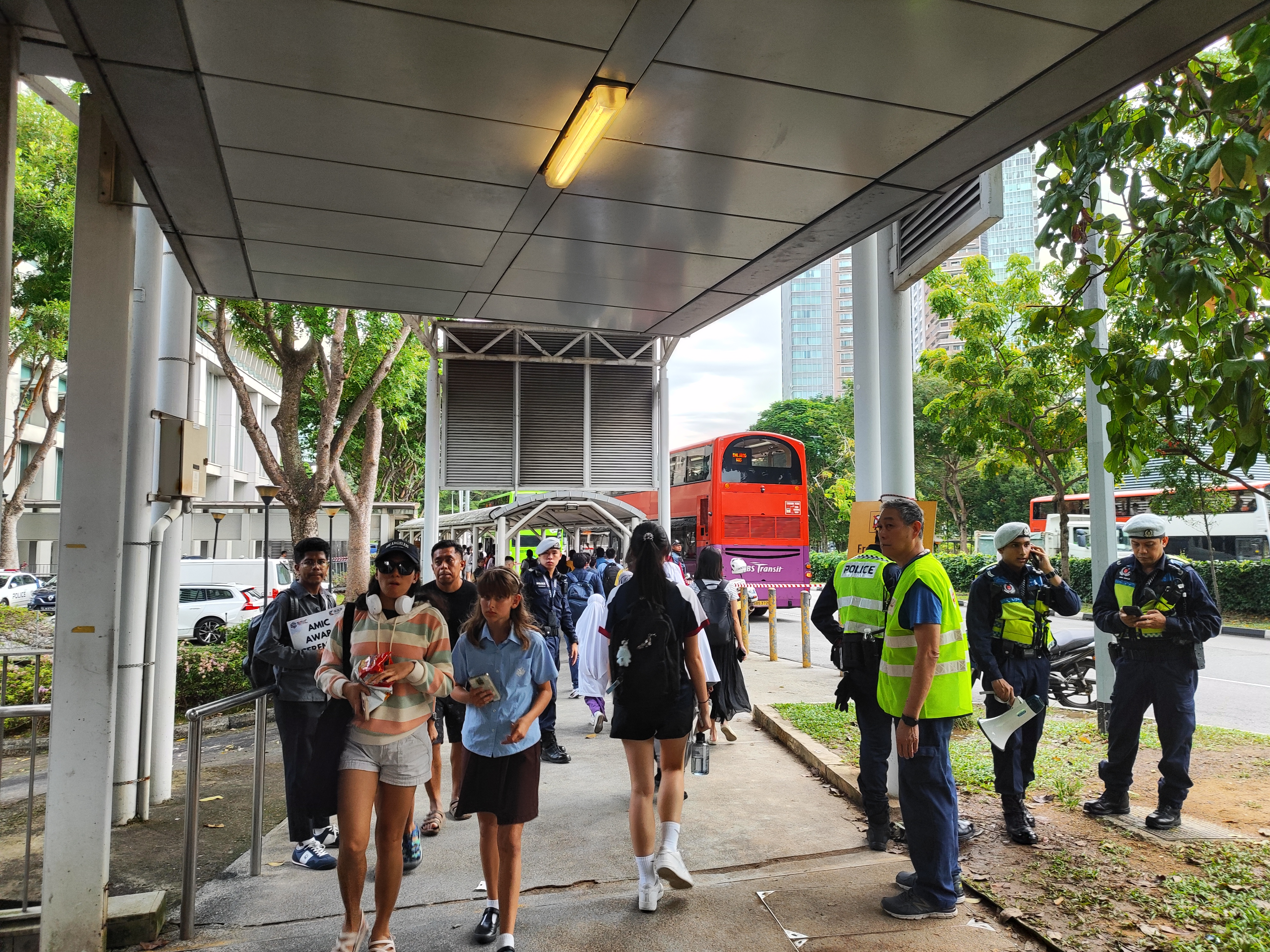
Police officers and other staff managing the crowd for bus bridging services at a bus stop near Buona Vista station

A point machine between Jurong East and Clementi station could not be salvaged and needed to be replaced. All of the damaged equipment needed replacement, and the point machines needed realignment and careful recalibration. Emergency repair works began the same day; more than 300 engineers and technicians were involved in rectification and replacement works. An investigation of the incident was started.

Free regular bus services were offered between Queenstown and Boon Lay stations, and SMRT Buses, SBS Transit, Tower Transit and Go-Ahead Singapore started running bridging buses between Buona Vista and Jurong East stations. Police officers, LTA ground staff, and personnel from the bridging bus operators were deployed to manage crowds at the affected stations. Shuttle train services between Queenstown and Buona Vista stations, as well as between Jurong East and Boon Lay stations, began at 3:56 p.m. and 4:11 p.m., respectively. By 26 September, the shuttle train services were running at 10-minute intervals. The authorities initially hoped to run a shuttle train service between Jurong East and Buona Vista by 27 September, but this was ruled out in favour of minimising delays in restoring full services. A new deadline was set for 30 September. In a Facebook post, the Transport Minister, Chee Hong Tat, issued an apology for the disruption.

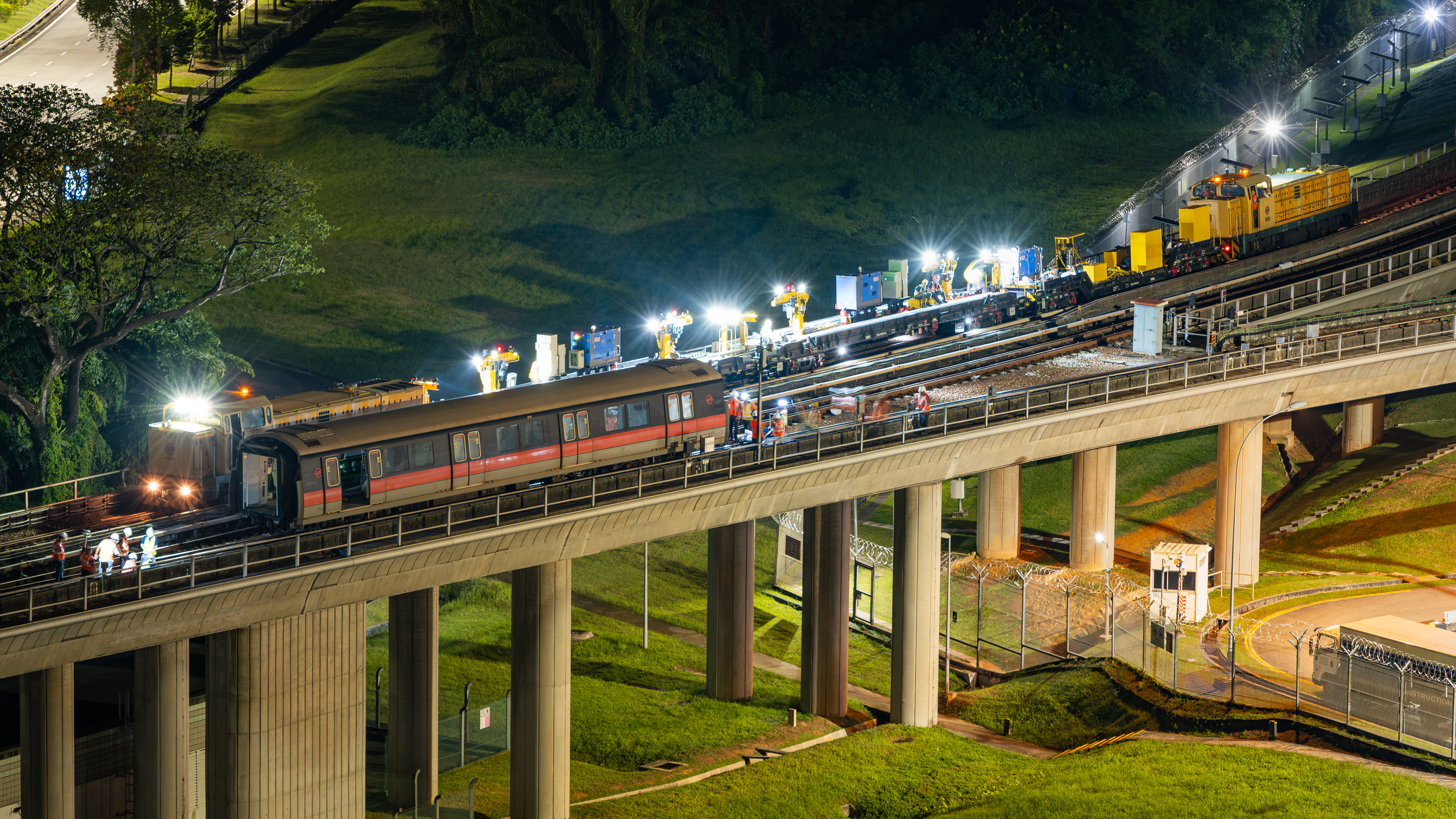
Engineers on the EWL tracks between Clementi and Ulu Pandan Depot

Before moving the train back to Ulu Pandan Depot, engineers attached a temporary axle box to the T310 train and used a hydraulic system to move the wheel back onto the rail. Power cables and the damaged point machines were replaced on 27 September, and repairs on the third rail were expected to be completed on the same day. During maintenance, the engineers had to use mechanical jigs instead of rail vehicles due to the broken rails. The next day, the LTA and SMRT reported that their engineers had made "significant progress" with the maintenance and the completion of heavy rail delivery work. The track point machines and associated trackside equipment were replaced and tested, and the power rail was restored. On this day, an estimated 374,000 passengers were affected. Once repairs were finished, systematic and functional tests – including checks on tracks, power supply and train signalling, and running trains at different speeds to ensure smooth operations – were planned for 29 September 2024.

In a joint statement on 29 September, the LTA and SMRT announced engineers had found 12 more cracks, which were previously not visible, through stress and loading tests during the replacement of other damaged parts of the track. The expected reopening of the segment was postponed to 1 October after more tests were carried out on 30 September. The next day, the LTA announced the restoration of the third rail, as well as the completion of locomotive stress tests, electric meggering tests, and track circuiting tests. Loaded-train endurance tests were still ongoing. Ultrasound tests were carried out on the welds of the tracks. The LTA and SMRT announced train services would resume on 1 October with temporary speed restrictions on westbound tracks for safety. Train speeds would be reduced from 60-to-80 km/h (37-to-50 mph) to 40 km/h (25 mph) for safety. Trains resumed running at full speed on 5 October.

== Impact ==
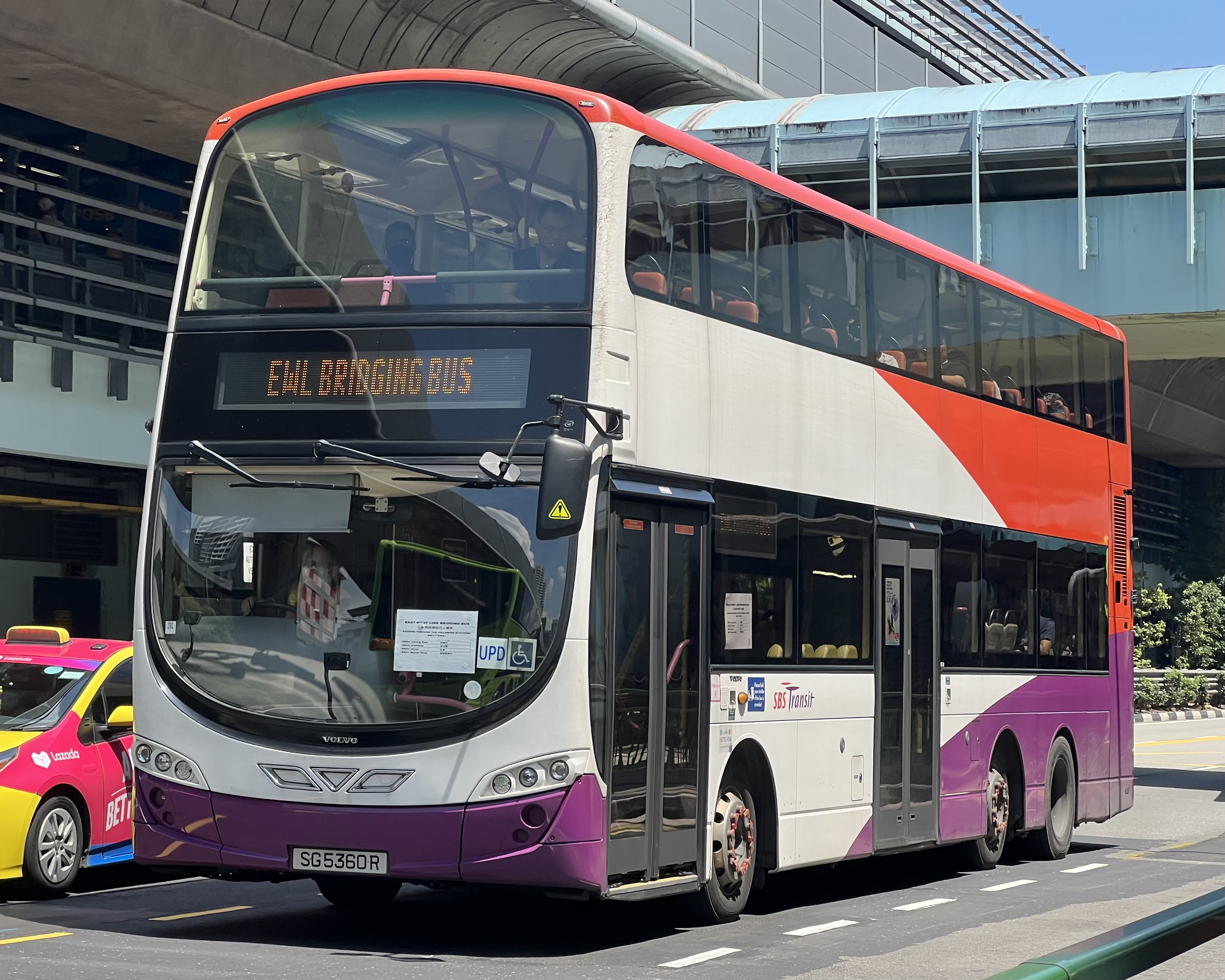
A bridging bus service deployed during the disruption

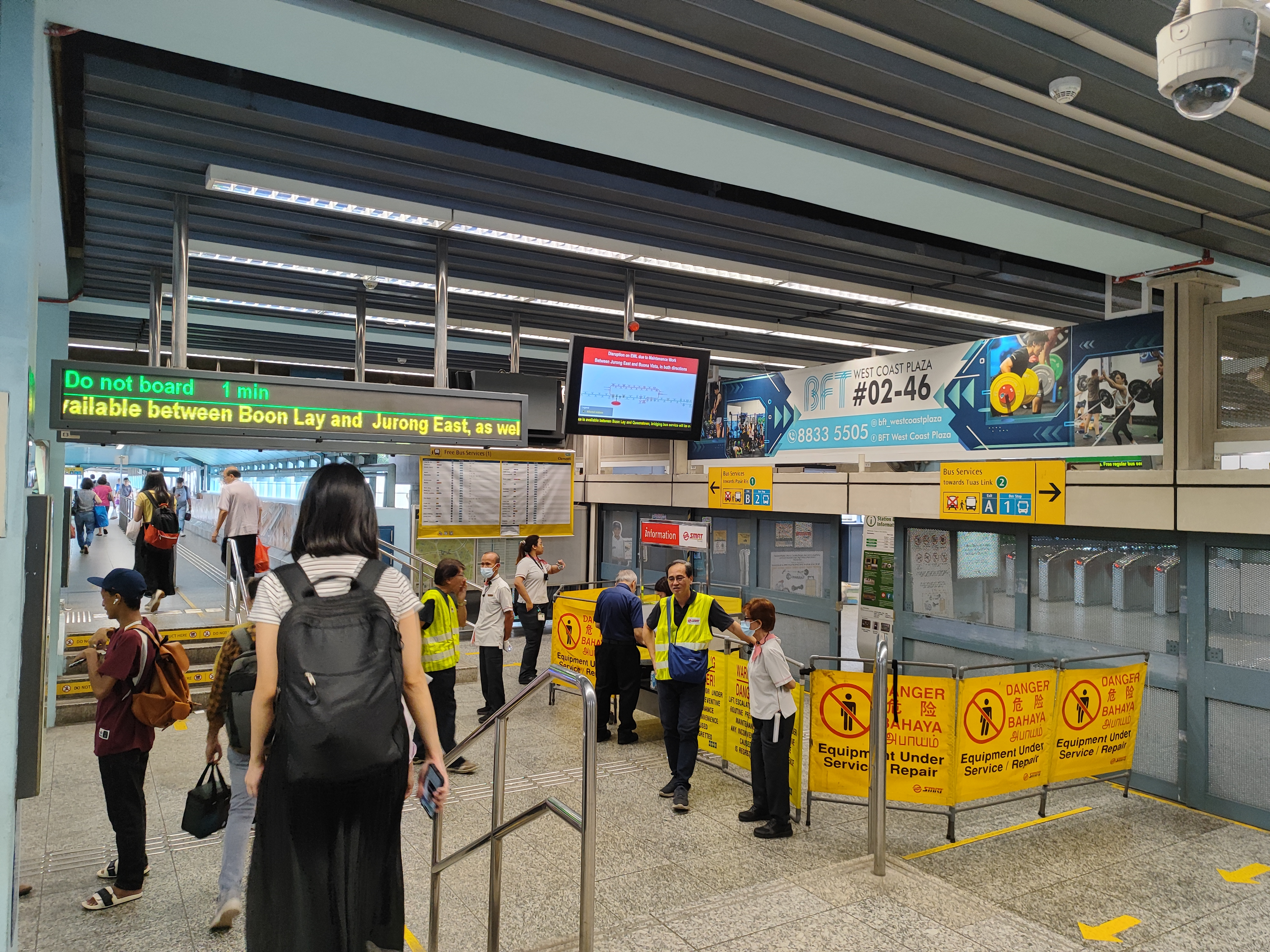
Clementi station, one of the stations closed during the repair works

According to CNA, The Straits Times and South China Morning Post, the incident was the most severe disruption to the MRT system in its history. The disruption caused significant increases in travel times; The Straits Times reported that a typical journey from Jurong East to Redhill took approximately 90 minutes instead of the usual 21 minutes. Queues at bus stops serving the affected stations were as long as 100 metres (330 ft). Many commuters were confused by the transport arrangements, such as the location of free bridging bus stops for closed stations. Some voiced their frustration about the disruption and its spillover effects, including the longer travel time and the long walking distance between Jurong East station and its associated bridging bus stop.

The disruption was estimated to have affected more than 2.1 million commuters as of 30 September, including 358,000 passengers on the first day, 516,000 passengers on the second day, and 500,000 passengers on the third day of the disruption. Passengers alighting at stations between Boon Lay and Queenstown were not charged, and bridging and regular bus services were provided for free. Overall, 2.6 million commuters were affected before services were restored.

The incident occurred during the Primary School Leaving Examination (PSLE). In response to the disruption, the Ministry of Education (MOE) announced students taking the PSLE on 26 September were granted the full allocated time to sit their paper as long as they arrived before the end of the exam. Free taxi services were offered to ferry students to their examination venues from affected stations, though according to The Straits Times, the students did not use taxis. Five students were late for their papers on 26 September, with one student taking the examination in a different examination centre. According to the Singapore Examinations and Assessment Board (SEAB), no candidates were affected by the disruption for the mathematics exam on 27 September. On 30 September, the SEAB reported that seven students were late for their papers on that day.

=== Regulatory and parliamentary response ===
On 2 October 2024, representatives from public bus operators and the LTA met to discuss their management of the bridging bus services during the disruption and to examine improvements needed for such incident-management plans. In 2025, CNA reported that SMRT's recovery efforts cost more than S$10 million (US$7.5 million). On 1 November, SMRT announced the establishment of a tripartite workgroup consisting of representatives from the LTA, SMRT, and the National Transport Workers' Union that would oversee the reliability and safety of the rail network.

Thirty-seven parliamentary questions regarding the incident were filed for the Transport Minister Chee Hong Tat, of which 19 were answered on 14 October. Chee summarised the circumstances of the incident in his ministerial statement, saying some details would only be confirmed after investigations were completed. Addressing questions on fare increases, he said service levels and disruptions are not considered in the Public Transport Council's (PTC) fare-review exercise, which is focused on financial sustainability and changes in operating costs. Reliability is managed separately through penalties and incentive schemes. Chee also said SMRT would bear all costs arising from the disruption, including free transport services, lost fare revenue, and repair works, and that affected staff would be compensated for overtime.

== Investigation ==
External image
- Diagrams and photos of the train bogie and axle box. Source: LTA

Jumadi Husani from the Road and Transport Authority in Dubai said the axle box, bogie and train wheels should not have come off under ordinary circumstances, and suggested it might have been due to faulty assembly of components after maintenance or the failure to replace defective parts. Similarly, electrical engineer Teo Chok Kok said: "it's very rare for [axle boxes] to drop". On 2 October 2024, the LTA launched an investigation to seek the root cause of the axle-box failure, and review the fault-detection and incident-handling procedures. An Expert Advisory Panel (EAP) was established to review the findings and providing expert advice for the investigation. Malcolm Dobell, the former Head of Train Systems for London Underground, was appointed as the EAP Chairman and was assisted by five other local and overseas experts.

The LTA and the Transport Safety Investigation Bureau (TSIB) released their separate findings on 3 June 2025. Both investigations concluded that the derailment was caused by the failure of the axle bearings within an axle box on the train. Because the affected components were burnt and damaged in the incident, neither report was able to determine the root cause of the failure. According to the LTA report, the failure likely began with the degradation of grease within the axle bearings, resulting in overheating. The excessive temperature, recorded at 118 °C (244 °F) by SMRT's Hot Axle Box Detection System (HABDS) hours before the incident, ignited and destroyed the rubber layers of the chevron springs, causing them to disintegrate and detach during operation. The absence of these springs led to the axle box detaching from the bogie near Dover station, causing four wheels of the front bogie to derail as the train entered Ulu Pandan Depot.

Both investigations also established that the train had exceeded its prescribed overhaul interval (Note: The duration before disassembly and reconstruction to restore trains to an "as good as new" condition.) of 500,000 kilometres (310,000 mi), having accumulated 690,000 kilometres (430,000 mi) of service. The train was part of the Kawasaki C151 fleet that was to be decommissioned and replaced by Movia R151 trains, the delivery of which was delayed due to the COVID-19 pandemic. Because SMRT was required to continue regular maintenance of old trains still in service, the operator had authorised two extensions to this interval through an internal waiver process. The LTA was aware of SMRT's practice of extending overhaul intervals, and the operator was not required to notify the LTA when such extensions were implemented. SMRT based its decisions on the fleet's overall reliability without conducting detailed engineering or risk assessments of the axle-box overhaul period because axle-box failures were considered rare.

The TSIB report noted that while the HABDS flagged the high temperature, the system produced a "Null ID" error that prevented identification of the affected train. The rolling-stock controller was not trained to handle the error, so the alert was dismissed as a false warning and no action was taken. The TSIB investigation team believed the train would likely have been withdrawn from service and the derailment averted if the "Null ID" error had not been dismissed.

== Aftermath ==
All Kawasaki C151 trains that had exceeded 500,000 kilometres (310,000 mi) of service since their previous overhaul were withdrawn from service and underwent axle-box overhauls before resuming operations in October 2024. The delivery of the new Movia R151 trains was accelerated, and all Kawasaki C151 trains were scheduled for decommissioning in the third quarter of 2025, and were fully decommissioned in September that year.

The TSIB also recommended close collaboration in information sharing among stakeholders – authorities, operators and manufacturers – in the rail industry. With the LTA's consultation, SMRT introduced data analytics to identify emerging abnormalities in axle-box temperatures, enabling preemptive intervention before any failures. The operator also resolved the HABDS system fault and reinforced its standard operating procedures to ensure staff promptly escalate high-temperature alerts to the Operations Control Centre. In November 2025, the LTA opened a tender for the supply of hot axle-box detection systems that would be installed on trains across existing MRT lines and the upcoming Jurong Region Line.

SMRT was initially fined S$3 million (US$2.2 million). While the LTA report recognised SMRT managed the service disruption "satisfactorily", it noted SMRT breached the licencing conditions of "severe service disruption". The fine was reduced to S$2.4 million (US$1.8 million) in July 2025 because the LTA acknowledged the "considerable challenges" of the Kawasaki C151 trains, especially in sourcing the required spare parts amid global supply chain disruptions caused by the COVID-19 pandemic. Despite this, the LTA required SMRT to invest at least S$600,000 (US$450,000) towards improving its capabilities and addressing areas of shortcomings from the incident to enhance service reliability for service users. In August 2026, the LTA awarded Chengdu Shengkai Co a S$12.5 million (US$9.4 million) contract to install HABDS across all existing MRT lines. The new system would replace the existing HABDS on the NSL, EWL and North East Line, thus standardising components and streamlining spare parts management and technical support.

== Notes and references ==
=== Sources ===
- Findings of Investigation into the Train Derailment Incident on the East–West Line (EWL) on 25 September 2024: Summary of Findings (PDF) (Report). Singapore: Land Transport Authority. 3 June 2025. Archived from the original (PDF) on 7 August 2026.
- Final Report: East–West Line Faulty Train Incident (PDF). Ministry of Transport (Report). Singapore: Transport Safety Investigation Bureau. 3 June 2025. TIB/RAI/CAS.014. Archived from the original (PDF) on 3 June 2025.
