= Clementi Public Library =

Public library in Singapore

- 1.3146587°N 103.7640229°E
- Location: 3155 Commonwealth Avenue West, #05-13/14/15, The Clementi Mall, Singapore 129588, Singapore
- Type: Public library
- Established: 23 April 2011; 15 years ago
- Branch of: National Library Board
- Public transit access: EW23 Clementi, Clementi Bus Interchange

Clementi Public Library is a public library in Clementi, Singapore. Situated on level 5 of the Clementi Mall, the library is located near Clementi Bus Interchange and Clementi MRT station.

== History ==
Officially opened on 23 April 2011 by Mr Lim Hng Kiang, Minister for Trade and Industry and Advisor to Telok Blangah Grassroots Organisations, Clementi Public Library serves the residents of South West Community Development Council.

== Layout ==
Covering an area of 1,900 m^{2}, the library contains a children's section, a 'new arrivals' section, a newspaper reading corner and an adult section.

== See also ==
- National Library Board
- List of libraries in Singapore
