= Clementi, Singapore =

Planning area and HDB Town in Singapore

Clementi
- Planning area and HDB town
- Clementi New Town

Other transcription(s)
  - Chinese: 金文泰; Jīnwéntài (Pinyin); Kim-bûn-thài (Hokkien POJ); Gam^{1} Man^{4} Taai^{3} (Cantonese Jyutping)
  - Malay: Clementi (Rumi)
  - Tamil: கிளிமெண்டி Kiḷimeṇṭi (Transliteration)
  - Thai: เคลเมนติ
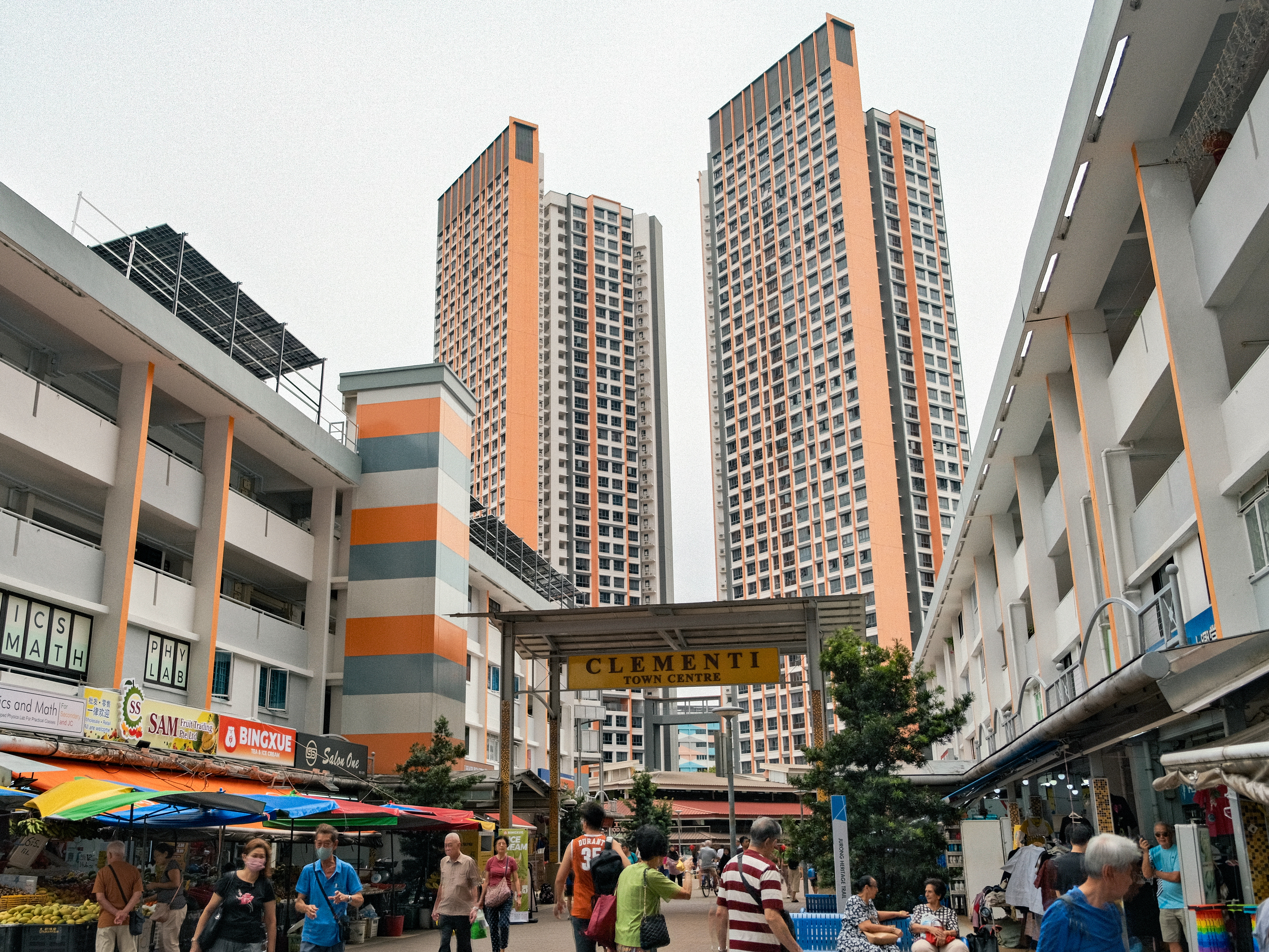
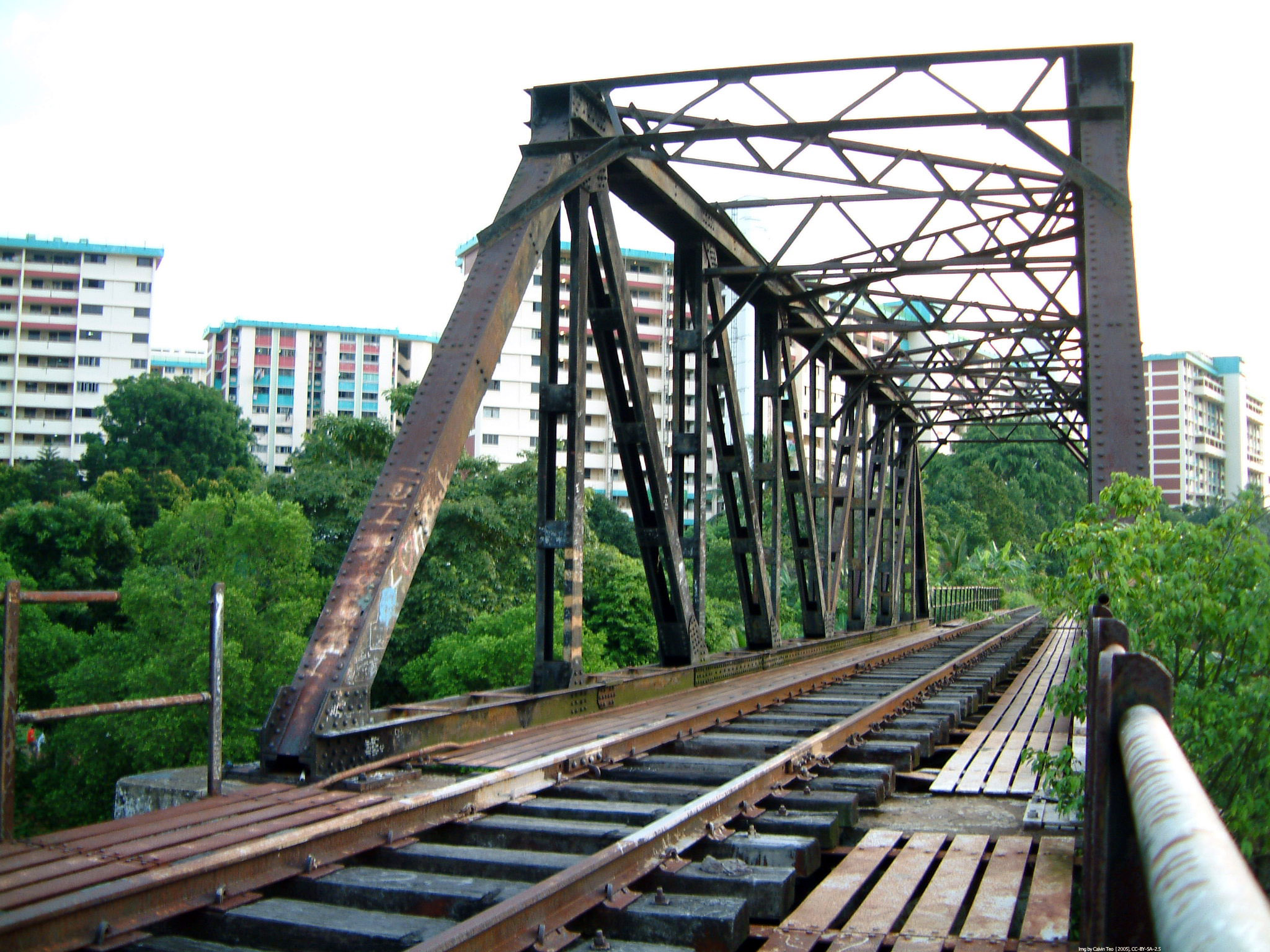
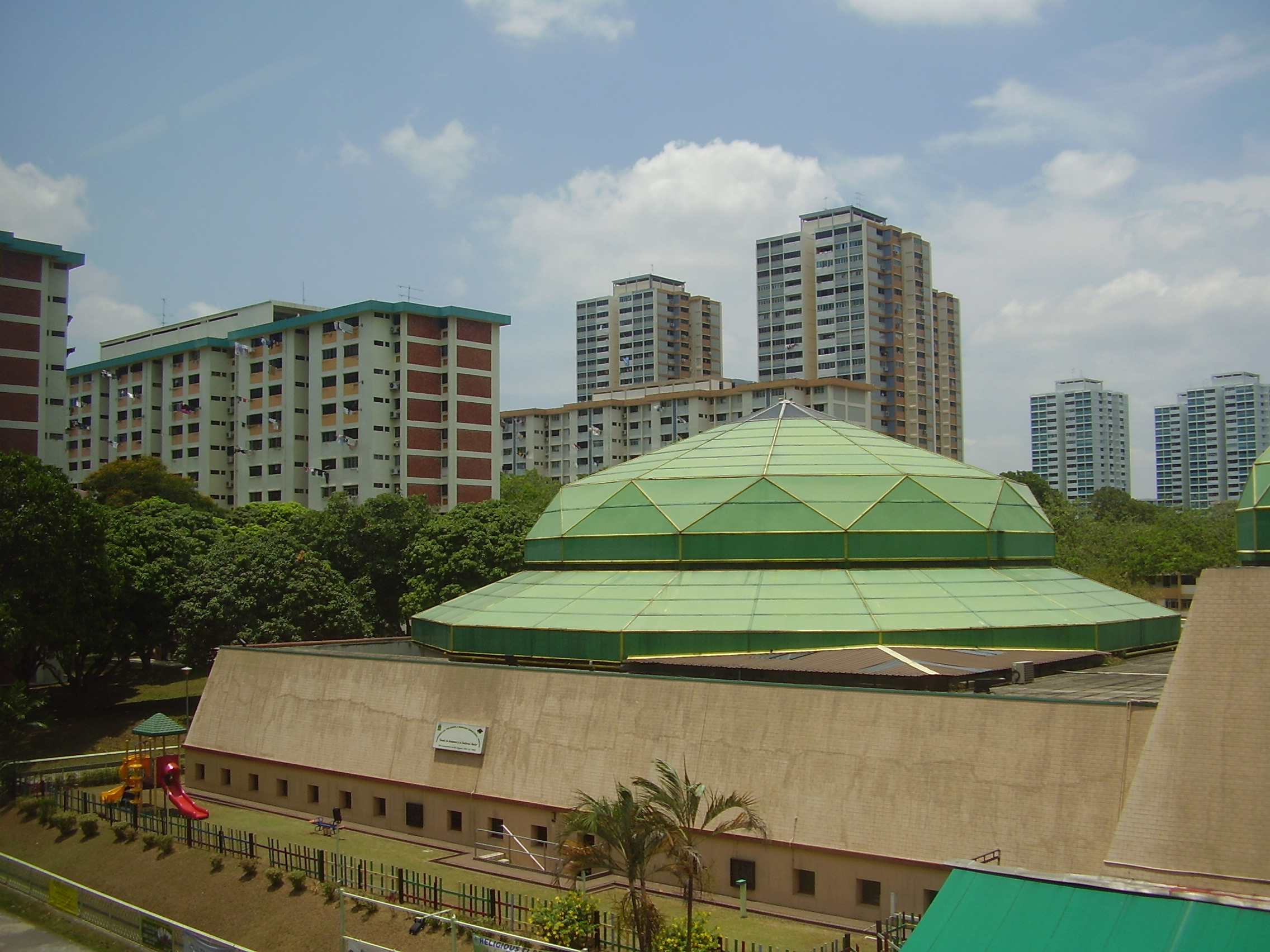
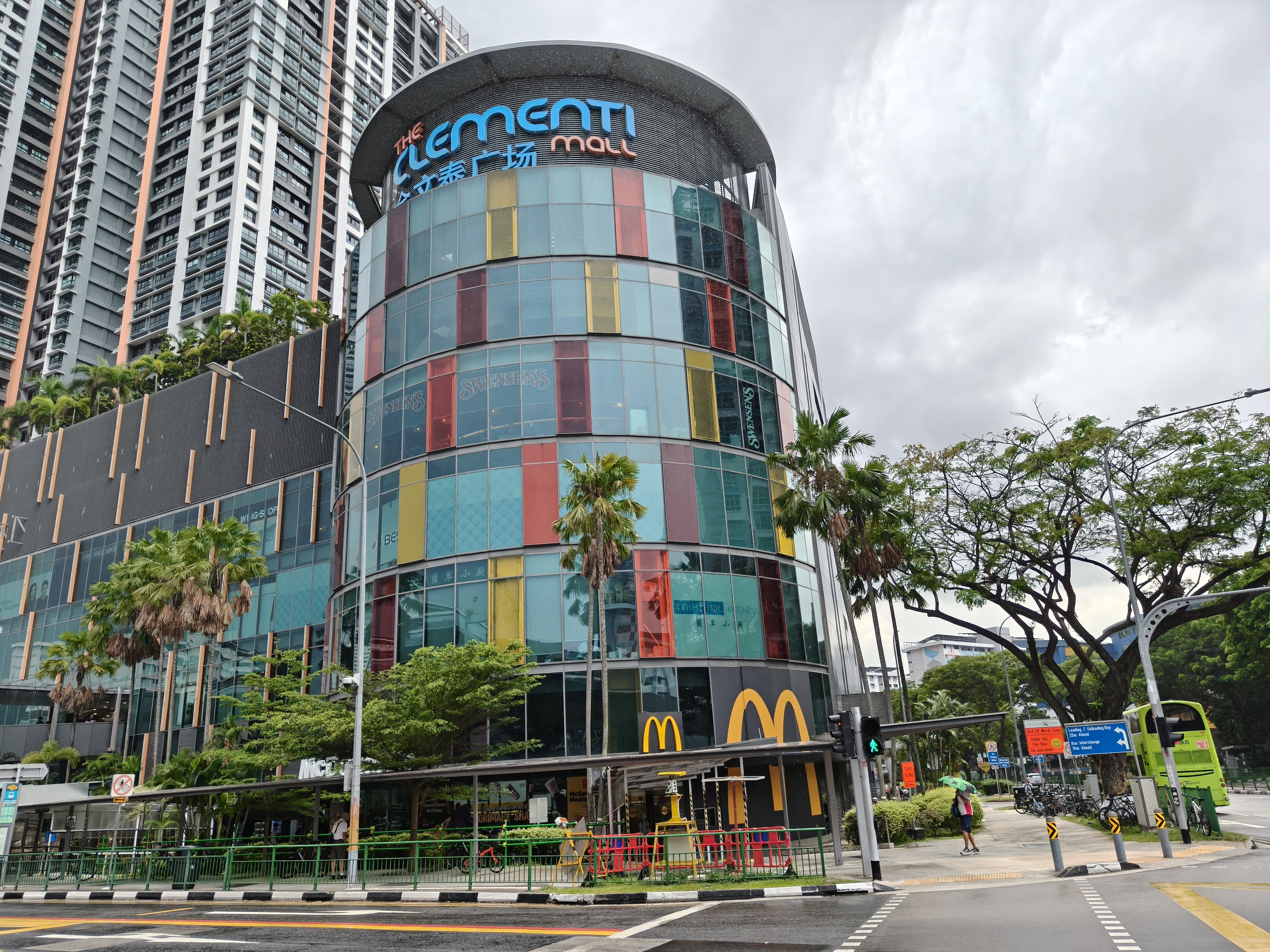
- From top left to right: aerial panorama of Clementi, Clementi Town Centre, Clementi MRT station, Jurong Branch Line of the former Keretapi Tanah Melayu railway line in Singapore, Darussalam Mosque, Clementi Mall

- Location of Clementi in Singapore

- Location of Clementi within Singapore
- Coordinates: 1°18′58″N 103°45′54″E
- Country: Singapore
- Region: West Region
- CDCs: North West; South West
- Town Councils: Holland–Bukit Panjang; Jurong–Clementi–Bukit Batok; West Coast–Jurong West
- Constituencies: Holland–Bukit Timah GRC; Jurong East–Bukit Batok GRC; West Coast–Jurong West GRC

Government
  - Mayors: North West CDC: Alex Yam; South West CDC: Low Yen Ling
  - Members of Parliament: Holland–Bukit Timah GRC: Christopher de Souza; Sim Ann; Jurong East–Bukit Batok GRC: David Hoe; West Coast–Jurong West GRC: Cassandra Lee; Desmond Lee

Area
  - Total: 9.52 km^{2} (3.68 sq mi)
  - Residential: 2.03 km^{2} (0.78 sq mi)

Population (2026)
  - Total: 104,350
  - Density: 11,000/km^{2} (28,400/sq mi)

Ethnic groups
  - Chinese: 73,630
  - Malays: 8,270
  - Indians: 6,970
  - Others: 3,120
- Postal districts: 5, 21
- Dwelling units: 25,480
- Projected ultimate: 39,000

Clementi (IPA: /kləˈmɛnti/ klə-MEN-tee, locally /ˈklɛmənti/ KLEM-ən-tee) is a planning area and residential town located at the easternmost fringe of the West Region of Singapore. The town borders Bukit Batok to the north, Bukit Timah to the northeast, Queenstown to the east and Jurong East to the west.

== Etymology ==
The planning area of Clementi derives its name from Clementi Road, the main traffic route that still runs into the district to this day. It was once known as Reformatory Road as there was a boys' home situated along the road. In 1947, the Singapore Rural Board discussed renaming the road. Their original intention was to name it after Sir Hugh Clifford, but it was eventually named as Clementi Road. It is generally suggested that the road was named after Sir Cecil Clementi Smith, who was the first British High Commissioner in the Straits Settlements. However, it is also possible that the road was named after Sir Cecil Clementi, another former Governor of the Straits Settlements (1930–33) who initiated the construction of Kallang Airport.

== History ==
The present area occupying Clementi Avenue 1 used to be known as 'Sussex Estate', named after the historic county of Sussex in England. The road running inside Sussex Estate was called Goodwood Road. It was developed in the mid-1950s to house the families of British senior non-commissioned officers. When Clementi underwent a major transformation beginning in 1975, Sussex Estate was the only pre-development feature that was retained. It was demolished in 1997.

Most of the area currently occupied by Clementi New Town today was once a military installation called 'Colombo Camp'. It is not known when the camp came into existence, however what is known is that the Singapore Guard Regiment, formed in 1948, stationed its troops there. When the regiment disbanded in November 1971, the camp was left to stand for another four more years before it was demolished in 1975.

Clementi New Town was subsequently developed between 1975 and 1979 on the plot of land that was once occupied by the camp. Planned as a self-sufficient residential town with a range of facilities and services, the Housing and Development Board (HDB) began clearing the area in 1974 and affected villagers were resettled.

An iconic landmark at Clementi is the steel truss railway bridge crossing Sungei Ulu Pandan. It was once part of the Jurong KTMB Railway Line which was constructed to facilitate the transportation of manufactured products from Jurong to Malaysia, and raw materials from Malaysia to the industrial estate at Jurong. Construction of the railway began in 1963, and the first train ran in 1966. The Jurong section of the railway remained in use for the next four decades until its closure in the early 1990s. Today, the disused track continues to attract much interest from the public, especially people with a taste for history, nature and photography.

== Geography ==
Clementi's arterial road, Clementi Road, runs for some 5 kilometres, from the vicinity around Bukit Timah, at Jalan Anak Bukit, to the West Coast Highway, but the geographical entity of Clementi is generally regarded as the area dominated by HDB flats around Commonwealth Avenue West and the Clementi MRT station. Besides Clementi Road, the two other arterial roads that serve the new town are the Ayer Rajah Expressway and the West Coast Highway.

The primary residential district in Clementi is Clementi New Town and forms a large bulk of its residents and identity. The area also consists of many landed properties, especially in the West of the area.

The boundaries of Clementi New Town are Sunset Way Estate to the North, Clementi Road to the East, West Coast Highway to the South, and Clementi Avenue 6 to the West.

=== Neighbourhoods ===
There are four constituencies in the town, and seven neighbourhoods (N1 to N7) within the Clementi vicinity. Most neighbourhoods are centered around or aligned with their respective neighbourhood hubs, where the majority of commercial activities take place, except for Clementi Town Centre.

=== Subzones ===
There are nine subzones in the planning area; Clementi Central, Clementi North, Clementi West, Clementi Woods, Faber, Pandan, Sunset Way, Toh Tuck and West Coast.

== Demographics ==
=== Population history ===
Resident population history
Year	Pop.	±% p.a.
2000	90,980	—
2005	85,880	−1.15%
2010	91,870	+1.36%
2015	91,630	−0.05%
2020	91,990	+0.08%
2025	104,240	+2.53%
2026	104,350	+0.11%

=== Age profile ===
The data below is from the population report published by the Singapore Department of Statistics as of June 2026.

Age group (years)	Males	Females	Total population	% of total population
0–4	1,940	1,840	3,780	3.62
5–9	2,620	2,460	5,080	4.87
10–14	2,650	2,700	5,350	5.13
15–19	2,680	2,660	5,340	5.12
20–24	2,370	2,420	4,790	4.59
25–29	2,600	2,640	5,240	5.02
30–34	3,050	3,460	6,510	6.24
35–39	3,760	4,330	8,090	7.75
40–44	3,790	4,380	8,170	7.83
45–49	3,900	4,370	8,270	7.93
50–54	3,790	4,170	7,960	7.63
55–59	3,240	3,430	6,670	6.39
60–64	3,200	3,300	6,500	6.23
65–69	2,710	3,140	5,850	5.61
70–74	2,490	3,510	6,000	5.75
75–79	2,470	3,090	5,560	5.33
80–84	1,120	1,470	2,590	2.48
85–89	710	1,050	1,760	1.69
90+	270	580	850	0.81

Age group (years)	Males	Females	Total population	% of total population
0–14	7,210	7,000	14,210	13.6
15–64	32,380	35,160	67,540	64.7
65+	9,770	12,840	22,610	21.7

Population pyramid of Clementi in 2026

The population distribution of Clementi in 2026 demonstrates an ageing population structure. There is a higher population concentration among middle-aged groups, with males peaking at the 45-49 age range (3.74%) and females peaking at the 40-44 age range (4.20%).

Notably, Clementi has a relatively high proportion of young and old dependents. The proportion of children aged 0 to 14 years old, 13.62%, is slightly higher than the national average of 13.34%. Similarly, the proportion of elderly above 65 years old, 21.67%, is higher than the national average of 19.50%. This indicates a mixture of young families and elderly residents in Clementi.

=== Household ===
Resident population by dwelling type in Clementi (2000−2026)
Year	HDB flats		Condominiums and other apartments		Landed properties	
Year	Pop.	Percentage	Pop.	Percentage	Pop.	Percentage
2000	77,970	85.7%	5,470	6%	6,090	6.7%
2005	71,840	83.7%	6,900	8%	5,820	6.8%
2010	73,090	79.6%	11,250	12.2%	5,930	6.5%
2015	70,420	76.9%	14,030	15.3%	5,800	6.3%
2020	67,410	73.3%	17,640	19.2%	5,730	6.2%
2025	70,400	67.5%	26,760	25.7%	5,580	5.4%
2026	69,730	66.8%	27,540	26.4%	5,560	5.3%

Clementi is undergoing a sort of gentrification in the types of dwellings residents live in. As of 2026, the proportion of residents in Clementi residing in HDB flats is 66.8%, which is lower than the national proportion of HDB dwellers at 75.5%, reflecting a greater prevalence of private property as compared to the national average. This is a stark contrast to roughly two decades before in 2000, when HDB dwellers in Clementi made up 85.7%.

Among the population, 28,430 residents, or 27.2% of the population, live in 4-Room Flats, making it the most common type of dwelling. This is closely followed by residents residing in condominiums and other apartments (27,540 residents, 26.4%).

As of 2025, the average household size in Clementi is approximately 3.00. Among the 39,500 households in Clementi, the most common household size is two persons, representing 24.8% of total households. This is followed by a household size of three persons, representing 20.8% of all households.

Clementi has a home ownership rate of 91.6% as of 2025. This is slightly higher than the national home ownership rate of 91.2%.

=== Ethnicity ===
Ethnic groups in Clementi (2000−2025)
Year	Chinese		Malays		Indians		Others	
Year	Pop.	Percentage	Pop.	Percentage	Pop.	Percentage	Pop.	Percentage
2000	69,563	76.5%	13,039	14.3%	7,101	7.8%	1,275	1.4%
2010	69,293	75.4%	10,732	11.7%	8,155	8.9%	3,694	4%
2015	70,700	77.1%	9,950	10.9%	7,600	8.3%	3,390	3.7%
2020	73,630	80%	8,270	9%	6,970	7.6%	3,120	3.4%
2025	85,310	81.8%	7,990	7.7%	7,390	7.1%	3,560	3.4%

As of 2025, Clementi has a lower level of ethnic diversity compared to the national average. This is driven by a considerably higher proportion of Chinese residents (81.8% vs. 73.9% nationally) and a smaller Malay community (7.7% vs. 13.5% nationally). Two decades ago, the area's ethnic makeup was much closer to the national average, a trend heavily tied to the housing shifts.

As the estate gentrified and HDB flats dropped from 85.7% in 2000 to 66.8% by 2026, the local demographics shifted. For example, between 2000 and 2025, the percentage of Malay residents in Clementi nearly halved, dropping from 14.3% to 7.7%. Meanwhile, the Chinese population rose from 76.5% to 81.8%, and "Others" grew from 1.4% to 3.4%, while the Indian population remained largely stable.

=== Religion ===
Religious affiliation in Clementi (2025 est.)
1. No religion (36.5%)
2. Buddhism (25.9%)
3. Christianity (19.3%)
4. Islam (9.60%)
5. Taoism (5.30%)
6. Hinduism (3.40%)
7. Other religions (0.11%)

In 2025, most residents in Clementi had no religion (33,500 residents, 36.5%). The second most common religion is Buddhism, with 23,800 practising residents (25.9% of the population), followed by Christianity, with 17,700 (19.3%) practising residents, including 6,700 Catholics (12.0%). Islam is practised by 8,800 residents (9.6%). Other religious affiliations include Taoism (4,900 residents, 9.7%), Hinduism (3,100 residents, 3.4%).

Compared to the national average of 23.9%, there is a substantially higher proportion of irreligious residents in Clementi.

=== Education ===
As of 2025, 98.4% of the population aged above 15 is literate, similar to the national average of 98.6%. 75.4% of residents are literate in two languages, with the most common language pair being English and Chinese (63.1%). Additionally, 5.2% of Clementi residents are literate in three or more languages.

Highest qualification attained of non-student resident population aged 15 years and over (2025 est.)
Qualification	Percentage	Singapore average
Below secondary	21.3%	19.9%
Secondary	12.1%	14.6%
Post-secondary (non-tertiary)	7.4%	11.1%
Polytechnic diploma	7.6%	10.2%
Professional qualification and other diploma	6.2%	7.5%
University	45.2%	36.7%

As of 2025, the proportion of residents in Clementi with a university qualification (27.6%) is considerably higher than the national average.

=== Language ===
Languages most frequently spoken at home, Clementi (2025 est.)
Languages	percent
English	58.2%
Mandarin Chinese	27.2%
Malay	9.4%
Non-Mandarin varieties	6.3%
Tamil	2.35%
Other Indian languages	0.45%
Others	0.11%

Of the 2,500 Indian language speakers in Clementi, majority speak Tamil (2,100 residents), representing 84% of all Indian language speakers in 2025.

=== Employment and income ===
According to the 2025 General Household Survey, 59,100 of residents aged 15 years and over in Clementi are employed, out of the 61,200 in the labour force. This equates to an employment rate of 96.6%, similar to the national employment rate of 96.7%, ranking Clementi with the 5th lowest employment rate among all subzones in Singapore. The remaining 28,435 residents aged above 15 in Clementi (35.9%) are outside the labour force.

Gross monthly employment income of employed residents aged 15 years and over (2025 est.)
Employment income	Percentage	Singapore average
Below S$1,000	3.2%	3.9%
S$1,000–S$1,999	8.3%	9.4%
S$2,000–S$2,999	8.3%	9.5%
S$3,000–S$3,999	7.3%	10.3%
S$4,000–S$4,999	6.4%	8.8%
S$5,000–S$5,999	6.1%	8.2%
S$6,000–S$6,999	5.8%	6.9%
S$7,000–S$7,999	5.8%	5.9%
S$8,000–S$8,999	3.9%	5.2%
S$9,000–S$9,999	4.7%	4.5%
S$10,000–S$10,999	5.8%	4.3%
S$11,000–S$11,999	3.9%	3.5%
S$12,000–S$14,999	9.3%	7.3%
S$15,000–S$19,999	10.7%	5.8%
S$20,000 and over	10.8%	6.7%

Monthly household employment income (2025 est.)
Household employment income	Percentage	Singapore average
No employed person	16.0%	14.2%
Below S$1,000	1.5%	1.2%
S$1,000–S$1,999	3.0%	3.4%
S$2,000–S$2,999	4.1%	3.7%
S$3,000–S$3,999	2.8%	4.2%
S$4,000–S$4,999	3.8%	3.7%
S$5,000–S$5,999	3.0%	4.1%
S$6,000–S$6,999	2.8%	4.0%
S$7,000–S$7,999	2.3%	3.6%
S$8,000–S$8,999	2.8%	3.8%
S$9,000–S$9,999	2.8%	3.7%
S$10,000–S$10,999	2.8%	3.8%
S$11,000–S$11,999	2.5%	3.7%
S$12,000–S$12,999	3.5%	3.5%
S$13,000–S$13,999	3.0%	3.2%
S$14,000–S$14,999	2.5%	2.8%
S$15,000–S$17,499	5.8%	6.2%
S$17,500–S$19,999	5.3%	5.5%
S$20,000–S$24,999	8.4%	8.0%
S$25,000–S$29,999	6.8%	5.0%
S$30,000–S$34,999	5.8%	3.3%
S$35,000 and over	9.1%	5.5%

== Politics ==
Clementi was last an independent political constituency in the 1984 general election. As of the 2025 Singaporean general election, Clementi was under the jurisdiction of three Group representation constituencies: a majority of Clementi (alongside the Faber areas) falls under the namesake division, which become a part of the Jurong East-Bukit Batok GRC, the West Coast and Pandan areas belongs to the West Coast-Jurong West GRC, and northern Clementi and Toh Tuck areas belongs to the Holland-Bukit Timah GRC.

Currently, West Coast-Jurong West Town Council office is still situated at the Clementi Mall, but it is now meant for residents in Dover, Pandan Gardens, Teban Gardens and West Coast. The namesake division was also part of the West Coast GRC until it was redistricted to Jurong GRC in 2015. Both constituencies has since been renamed in 2025.

== Amenities ==
The Commonwealth Cinema on the south side of Clementi MRT station was demolished in 2008 and rebuilt into a four-storey shopping mall, previously named 'CityVibe', but later renamed to 'Grantal Mall'. The former Eng Wah's Empress Entertainment Centre Cineplex was also rebuilt and reopened as '321 Clementi' in March 2015.

Further from the town centre, a shopping complex, West Coast Plaza, serves the residents along West Coast Road.

The Singapore Police 'D' Divisional Headquarters is located at Clementi Avenue 5, while the Clementi Neighbourhood Police Post is situated at Clementi Avenue 3. Clementi Fire Station is located off Commonwealth Avenue West.

In April 2005, the HDB announced plans to build a new mixed-use development at Clementi Town Centre, on the existing bus interchange site. The new development complex was to house a 5-storey retail podium with two basements, two 40-storey residential blocks (Clementi Towers), the West Coast Town Council (Clementi Office), a public library and an air-conditioned bus interchange. On 21 May 2011, The Clementi Mall – the retail shopping mall part of the mixed-use development, officially opened. The mall is linked directly to Clementi MRT station on the third level, and the air-conditioned Clementi Bus Interchange at the first level has direct access to the mall. It is the first development in Singapore to integrate public housing, public transport and commercial facilities built together within a single complex. On 15 May 2012, the mixed development won the prestigious international FIABCI Prix d'Excellence award, scoring the Runner-up award under the Master Plan Category.

Clementi United Temple, Singapore Buddhist Youth Mission, Ang Chee Sia Ong Temple and Tentera Di-Raja Mosque are some places of worship located in Clementi.

Dover Forest, located just across the Ulu Pandan Rd, is a half-century old secondary regrowth forest embedded in the urban matrix of Ulu Pandan, Singapore. Bounded by three roads and a concrete canal, its 33 hectares consist of western and eastern halves separated by a mowed grass lawn. The forest contains more than 158 animal species, inclusive of critically endangered ones, and 120 plant species. In the Urban Redevelopment Authority Master Plan 2014, the forest was zoned as residential which resulted in Housing and Development Board (HDB) planning to convert forest into a new residential area in 2020. Nature Society (Singapore), as well as other nature groups such as Singapore Youth Voices for Biodiversity and LepakInSG, raised concerns about the plans for the conversion. Two studies were then conducted by HDB and National Parks Board separately on the biodiversity and connection to nearby forests. The initial plans were then changed to retain the western half of the forest while 11 hectares of the eastern half will be developed into housing use.

== Recreation ==
Clementi has a swimming complex and a sports hall for various net or ball sports located near the MRT station. The Clementi Stadium, with a capacity of 4,000 spectators, is located near West Coast Road and can be seen from the Ayer Rajah Expressway. West Coast Park and Clementi Woods Park are situated further away from the central area but are still accessible by bus.

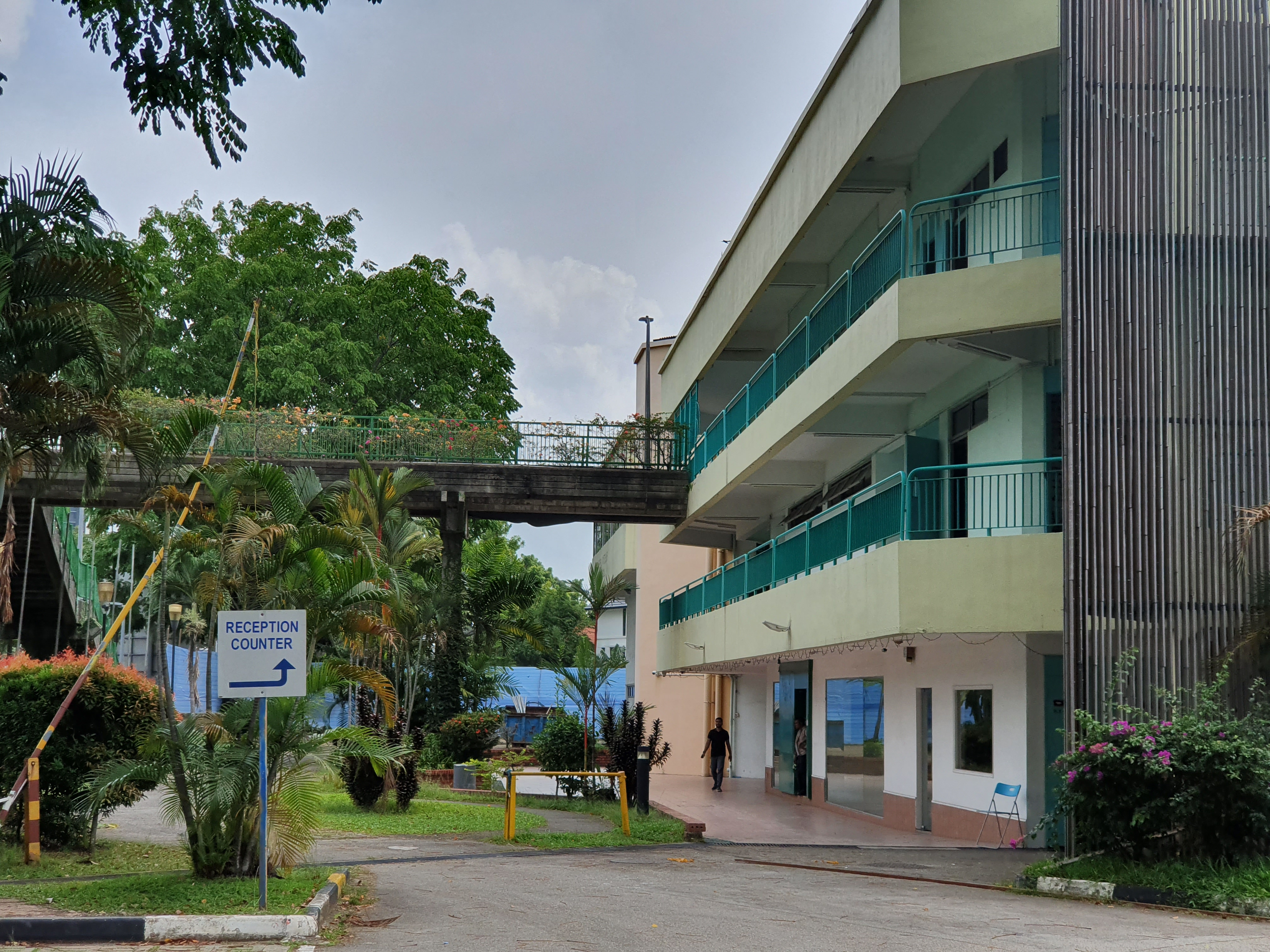
The West Coast Recreation Centre, closed for demolition. Northeast side, where the overhead bridges lead to.

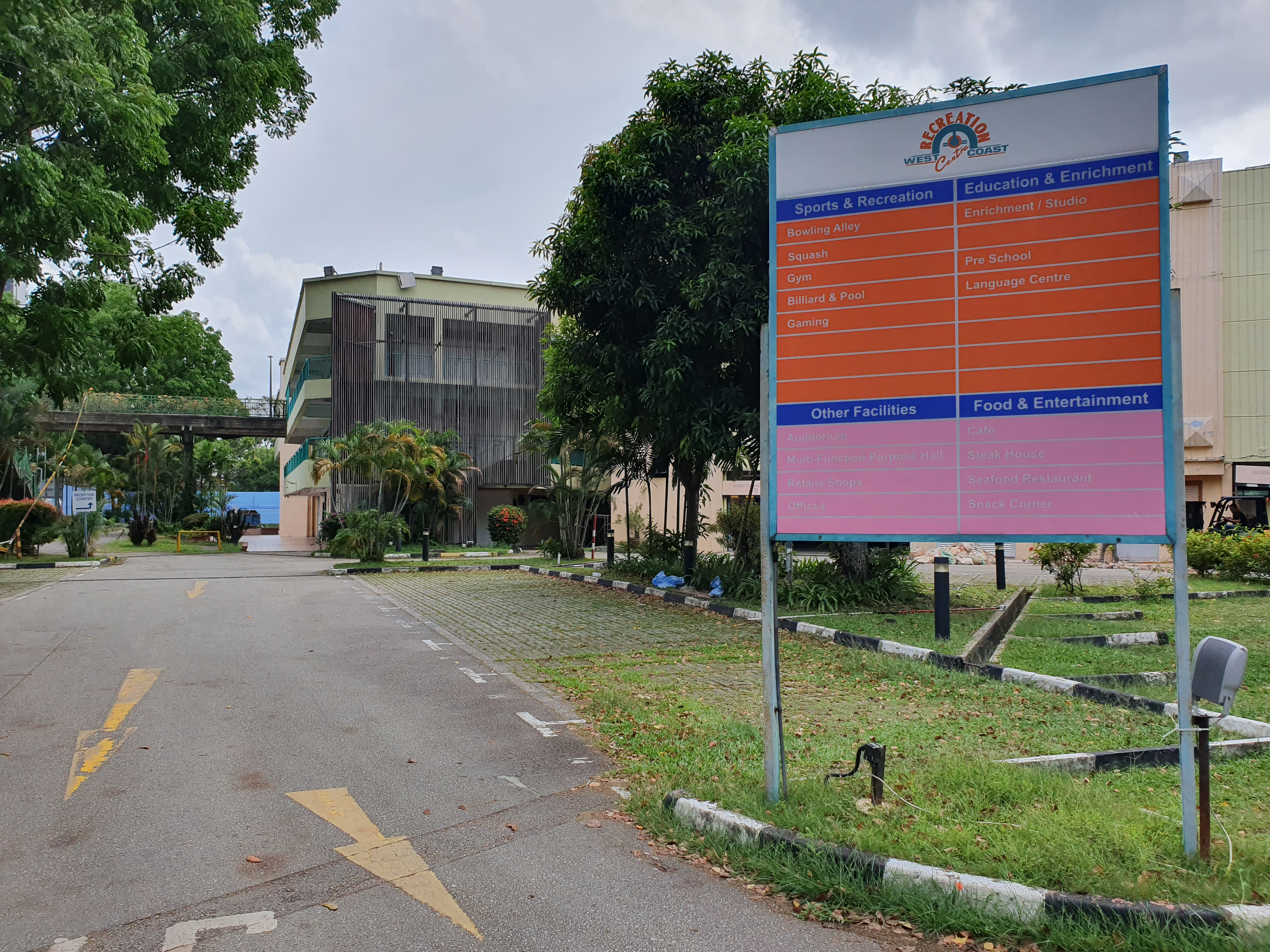
The signboard in the carpark of the West Coast Recreation Centre, facing the entrance/exit.

The former West Coast Recreation Centre, which was located next to the Clementi Stadium, ceased operations in December 2019, and was demolished in 2020.

== Education ==
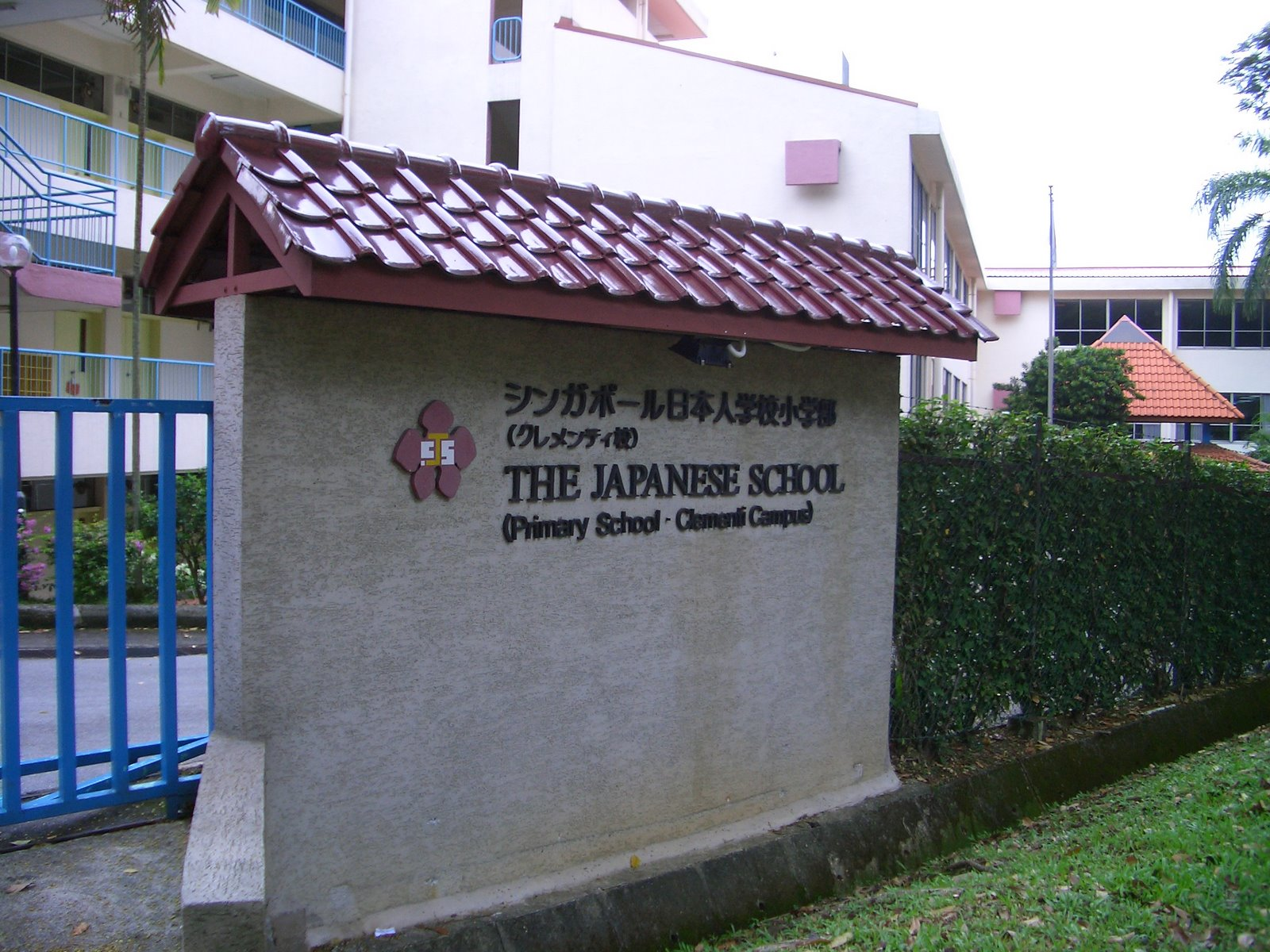
The Japanese School Primary School Clementi Campus

Clementi is serviced by several educational facilities, some of which have a long history. Primary schools in the area include Clementi Primary School, Nan Hua Primary School, Pei Tong Primary School and Qifa Primary School. Secondary schools include Clementi Town Secondary School, Nan Hua High School, New Town Secondary School and Kent Ridge Secondary School. The NUS High School of Mathematics and Science, an independent school specialising in Mathematics and Science, is located at Clementi Avenue 1. The School of Science and Technology, Singapore, which specialises in Science, Technology and Applied Learning, is located at the junction of Clementi Road and Commonwealth Avenue West near Dover MRT station and Clementi MRT station as well.

Tertiary educational institutions bordering or situated along Clementi Road include Ngee Ann Polytechnic, SIM Headquarters, Singapore University of Social Sciences and the National University of Singapore (NUS). There is a direct bus service from the Clementi bus interchange that loops around the NUS campus. Singapore Polytechnic is located along Commonwealth Avenue West next to Dover MRT Station.

The Japanese School, Singapore or Singapore Nihonjin gakkō operates one of its two primary schools at Clementi Road, directly opposite NUS. A private Japanese Kindergarten is just next to the Japanese Secondary School. Waseda Shibuya Senior High School Singapore campus is also located at West Coast Road.

== Transportation ==
Clementi New Town is served by Clementi MRT station (EW23) on the East West MRT line and bus services to Clementi Bus Interchange and different parts of the town.

The Clementi Bus Interchange is used mainly by SBS Transit and Tower Transit. Clementi Bus Interchange had moved temporarily on 29 October 2006. before the air-conditioned bus interchange opened on 26 November 2011.
