= Clementi Mall =

Shopping mall in West Region, Singapore

The Clementi Mall
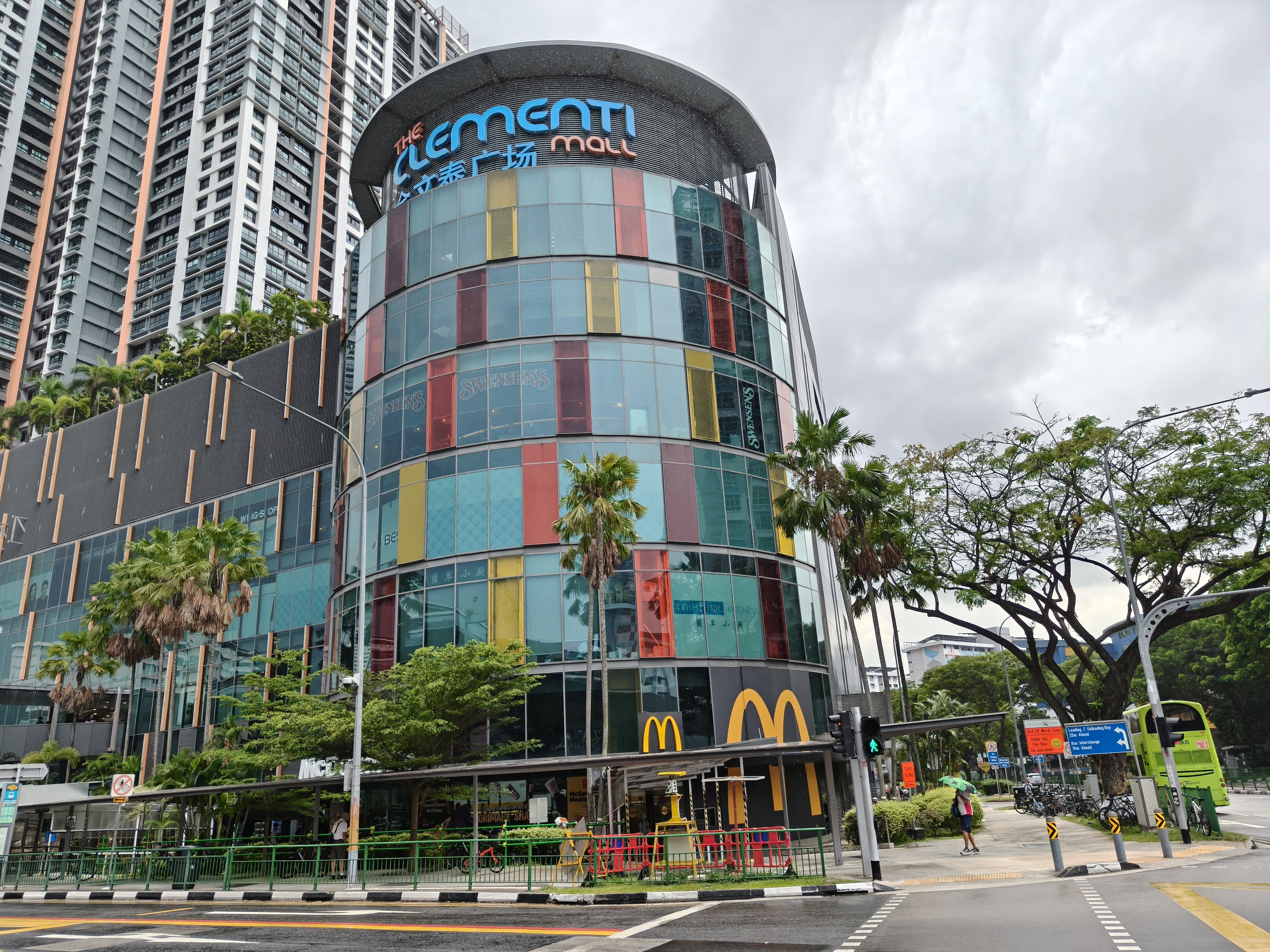
- The Clementi Mall
- Location: 3155 Commonwealth Avenue West, Singapore 129588
- Coordinates: 1.31468°N 103.7643°E
- Opened: 14 January 2011; 15 years ago (operational); 21 May 2011; 15 years ago (official)
- Owner: Elegant Group
- Num. of stores: 135
- Floor area: 191,000 square feet (17,700 m^{2})
- Floors: 6
- Public transit: EW23 Clementi; Clementi
- Website: www.theclementimall.com

The Clementi Mall (Chinese: 金文泰广场) is a shopping mall located in Clementi, Singapore. It is a six-storey retail development totaling approximately 191,000 square feet of retail space, which includes a basement shopping level and a basement carpark. The mall provides a range of stores and services, including the neighbourhood library. It was built on the site of the old Clementi bus interchange.

== History ==
To facilitate construction works for the integrated hub, Clementi Bus Interchange was moved to a temporary site next to its original location in late 2006.

The Clementi Mall opened for business in January 2011, with the grand official opening ceremony on 21 May 2011 officiated by the 7th President of Singapore, Tony Tan. The mall is owned by Paragon Reit, and allows the use of eCapitaVouchers. Above the mall is Clementi Towers, the first HDB project to be co-located within a shopping mall and bus interchange.

The mall hosts 135 retail outlets including 16 restaurants and cafes. Anchor tenants include Best Denki, Uniqlo, Miniso and NTUC FairPrice Finest. Tenants that have shut down include BHG (replaced by Uniqlo), Cotton On (replaced by Switch+), Rubi Shoes (replaced by Skechers) and Typo (replaced by Vivian & Sean).

The Clementi Public Library is located in the mall, as is the office of the West Coast Town Council. The branch office of Singapore Post, previously located at Level 5, ceased operations in September 2024.

In 2025, investment firm Elegant Group agreed to purchase the mall from Cuscaden Peak Investments for S$809 million (US$624.6 million).

== Transport connections ==
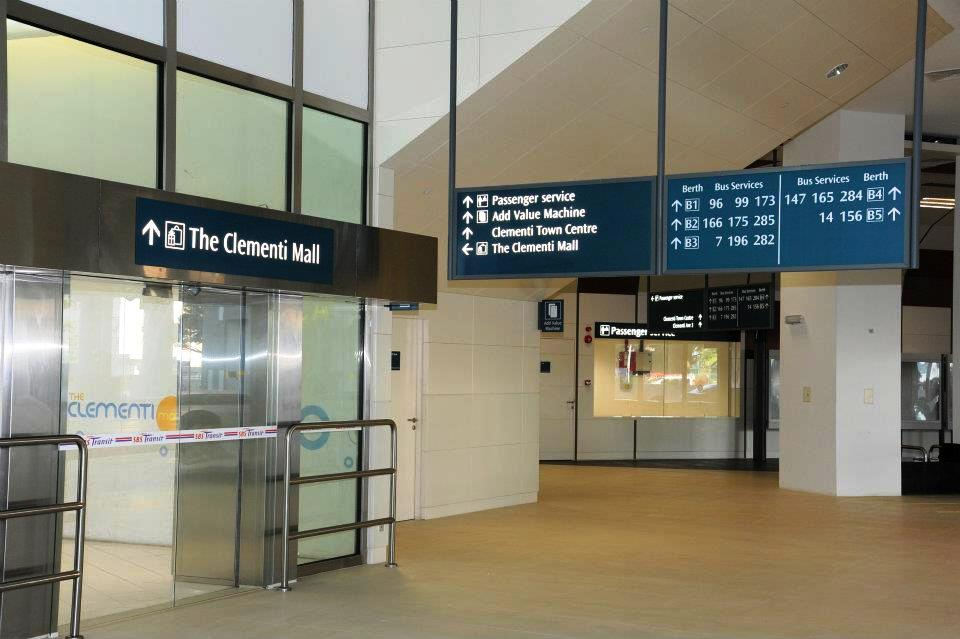
Clementi Bus Interchange

The Clementi Bus Interchange is integrated to the mall on the ground floor, while Clementi MRT station is connected directly to the mall via a link bridge at Level 3.

== Gallery ==
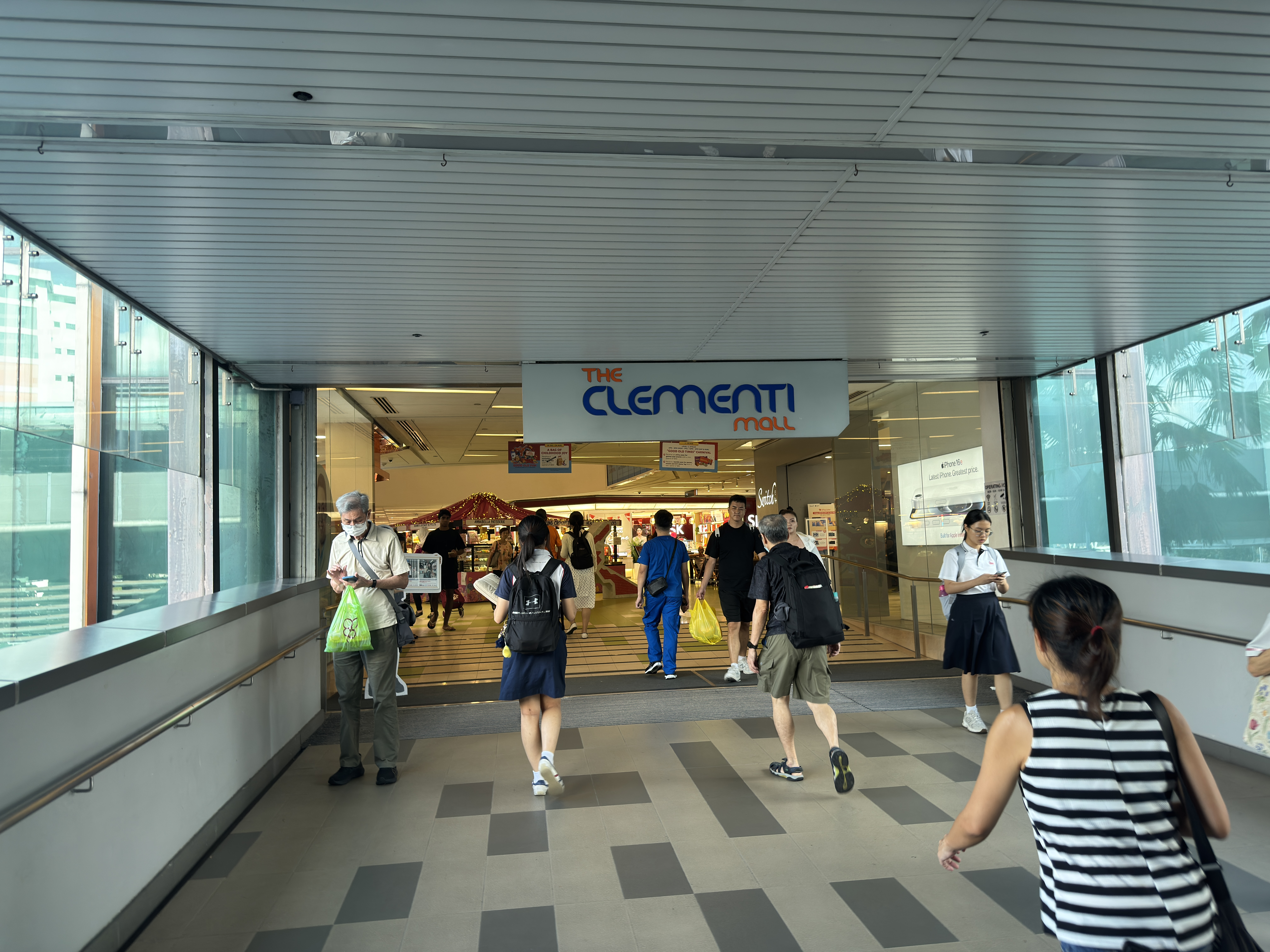
Entrance of Clementi Mall from Clementi MRT Station

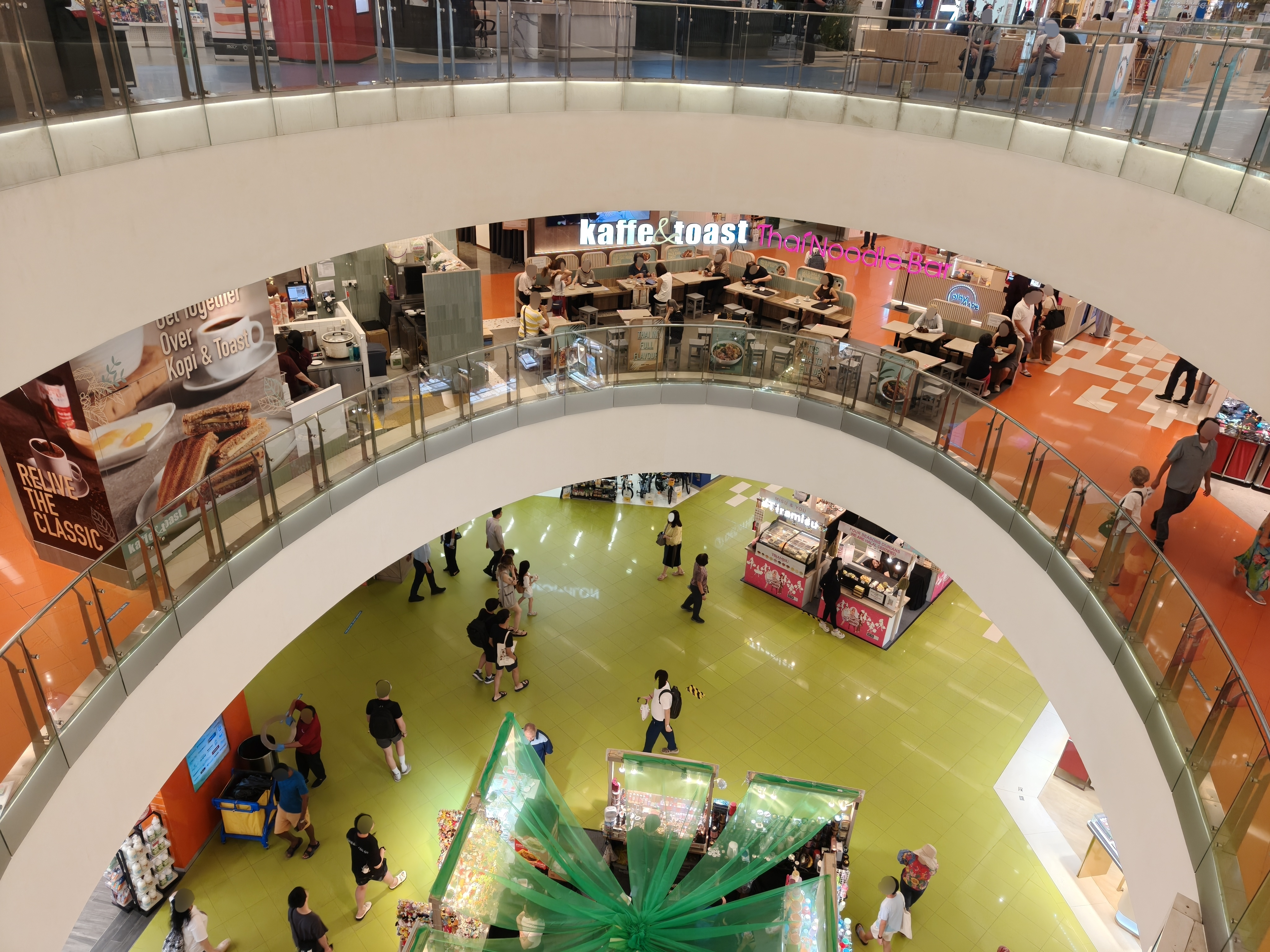
Atrium at Level 3

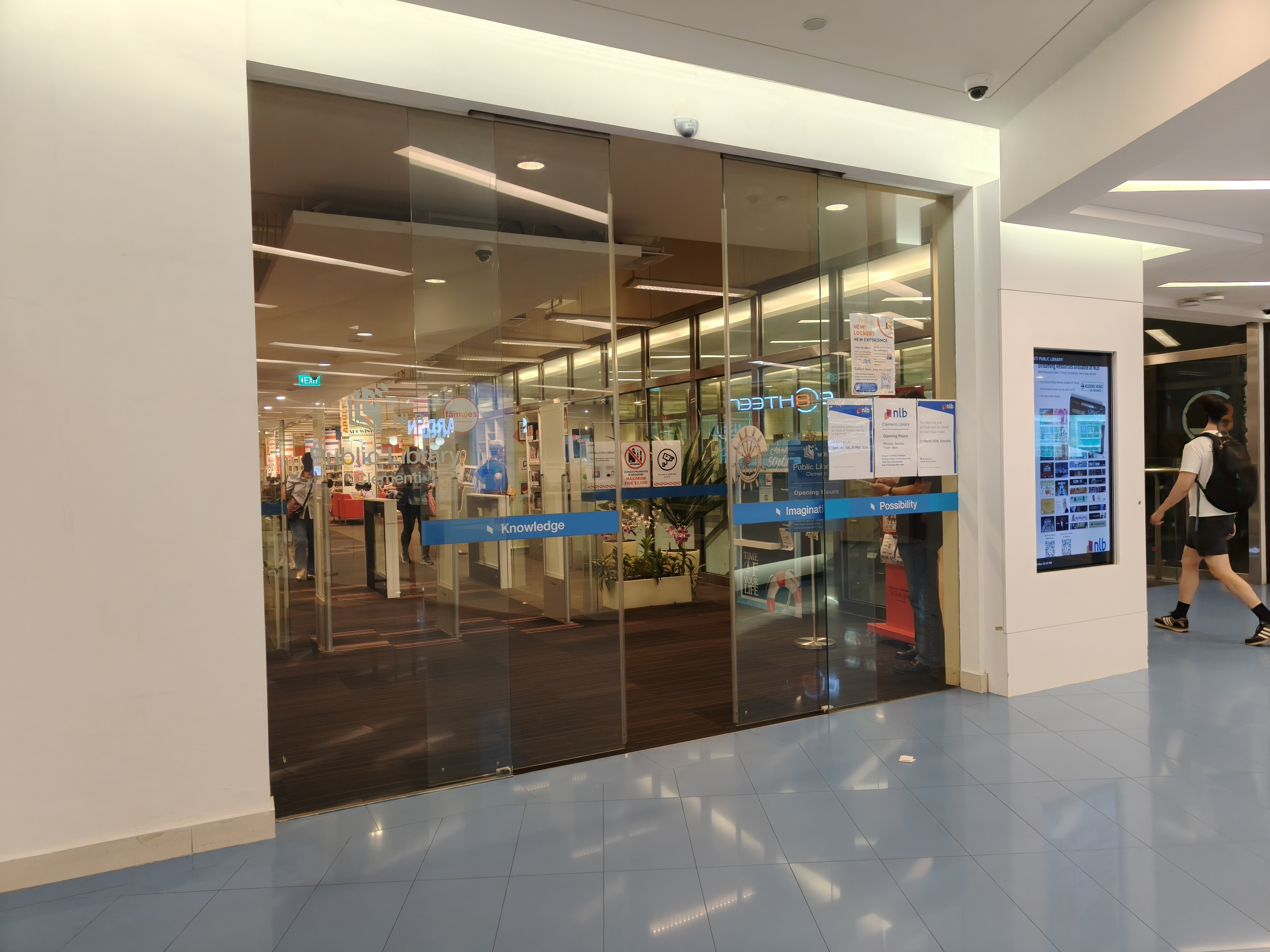
Clementi Public Library at Level 5

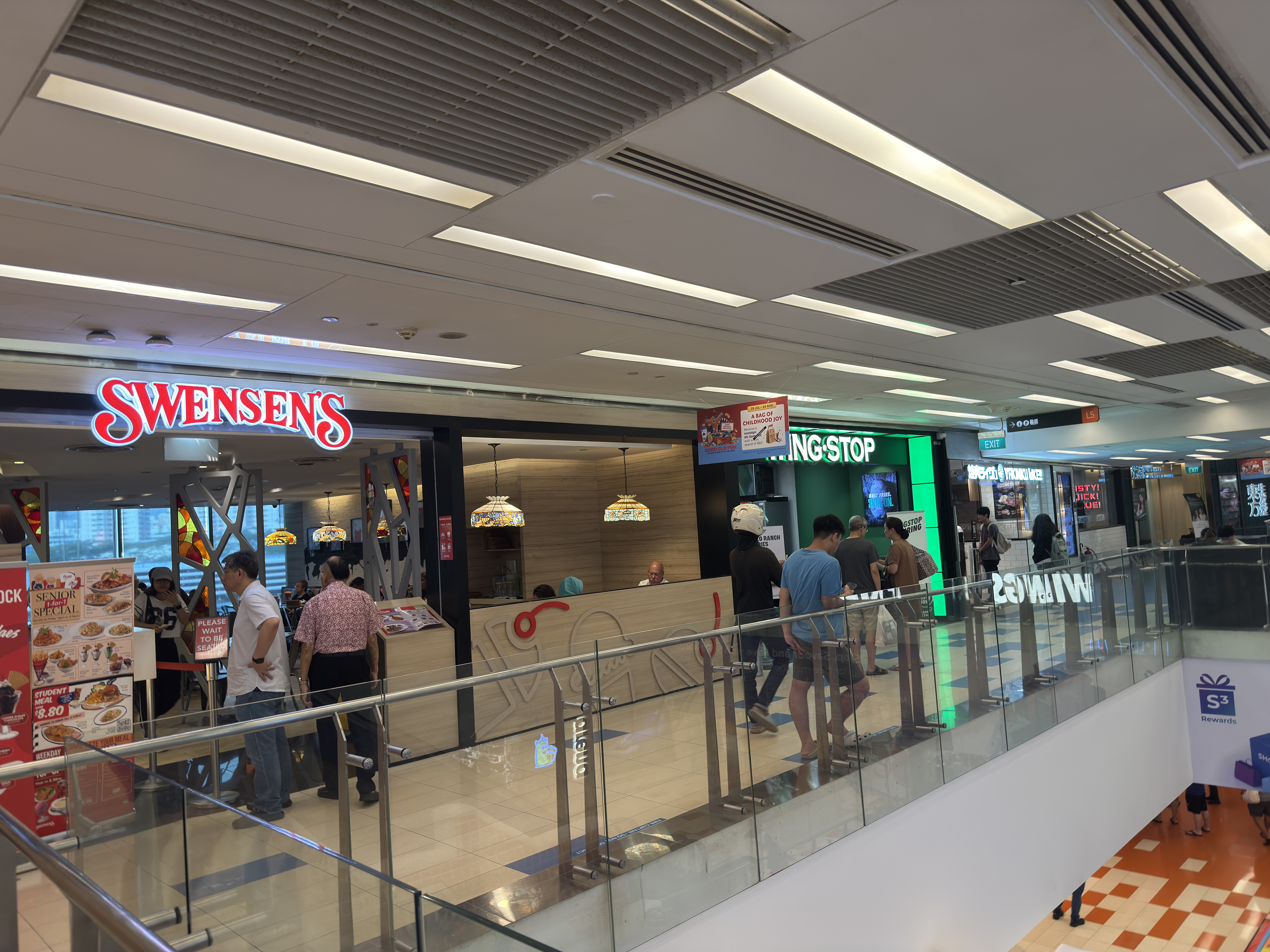
Level 5 shops
