= Clementi Bus Interchange =

Bus interchange in Clementi, Singapore

Clementi Bus Interchange 金文泰巴士转换站 Pusat Pertukaran Bas Clementi
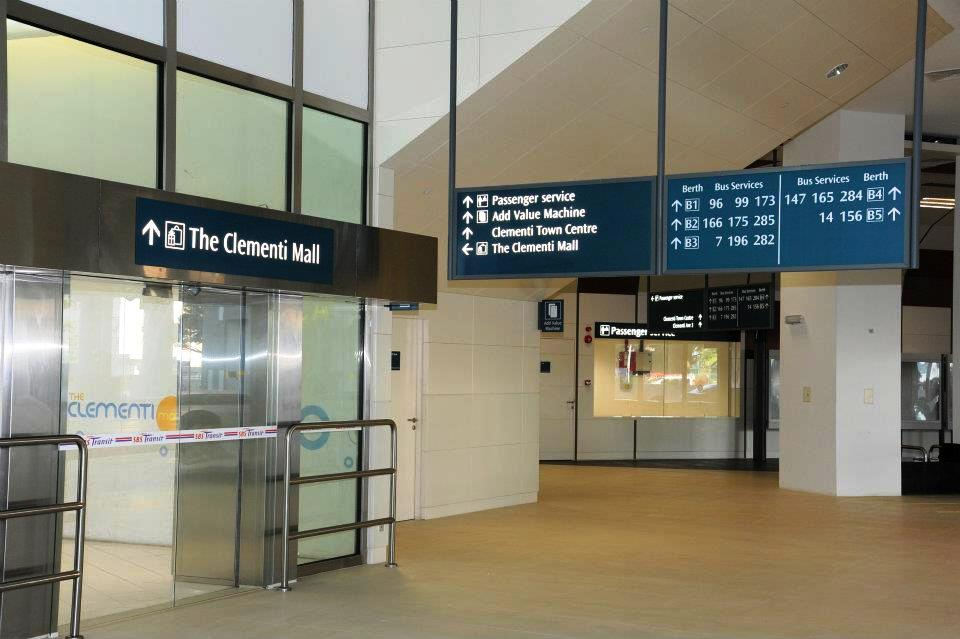
- The bus interchange is integrated with the Clementi Mall and Clementi Town Centre.

General information
- Location: 441 Commonwealth Avenue West, Singapore 120441
- System: Public Bus Interchange
- Owner: Land Transport Authority
- Operator: SBS Transit
- Bus routes: 9 (SBS Transit); 5 (Tower Transit Singapore)
- Bus stands: 5 Sawtooth Boarding Berths; 3 Alighting Berths
- Bus operators: SBS Transit; Tower Transit Singapore
- Connections: EW23 CR17 Clementi

Construction
- Structure type: At-grade
- Accessible: Accessible alighting/boarding points Accessible public toilets Graduated kerb edges Tactile guidance system

History
- Opened: 16 November 1980; 45 years ago (Old); 29 October 2006; 20 years ago (Temporary); 26 November 2011; 14 years ago (Integrated Transport Hub)
- Closed: 28 October 2006; 20 years ago (Old); 25 November 2011; 14 years ago (Temporary)

Key dates
- 16 November 1980: Commenced operations
- 29 October 2006: Operations transferred to Temporary bus interchange
- 26 November 2011: Operations transferred to new and air-conditioned bus interchange as Integrated Transport Hub

Clementi Bus Interchange is an air-conditioned bus interchange located at Clementi Town Centre, serving residential areas around Clementi and West Coast. It is the sixth air-conditioned bus interchange in Singapore, integrated within Clementi Mall and Clementi Towers, and seamlessly connected to Clementi MRT station. Nearby public amenities include the Grantral Mall, Clementi Polyclinic, 321 Clementi and Block 448 Market & Hawker Centre.

== History ==
The interchange was first opened on 16 November 1980 by Chor Yeok Eng, Senior Parliamentary Secretary for Environment and Member of Parliament for Bukit Timah. It was a long covered walkway structure with queue railings and berths at the side of the road, leading many people to call it a "roadside bus terminal" resembling the interchanges built in the 1970s.

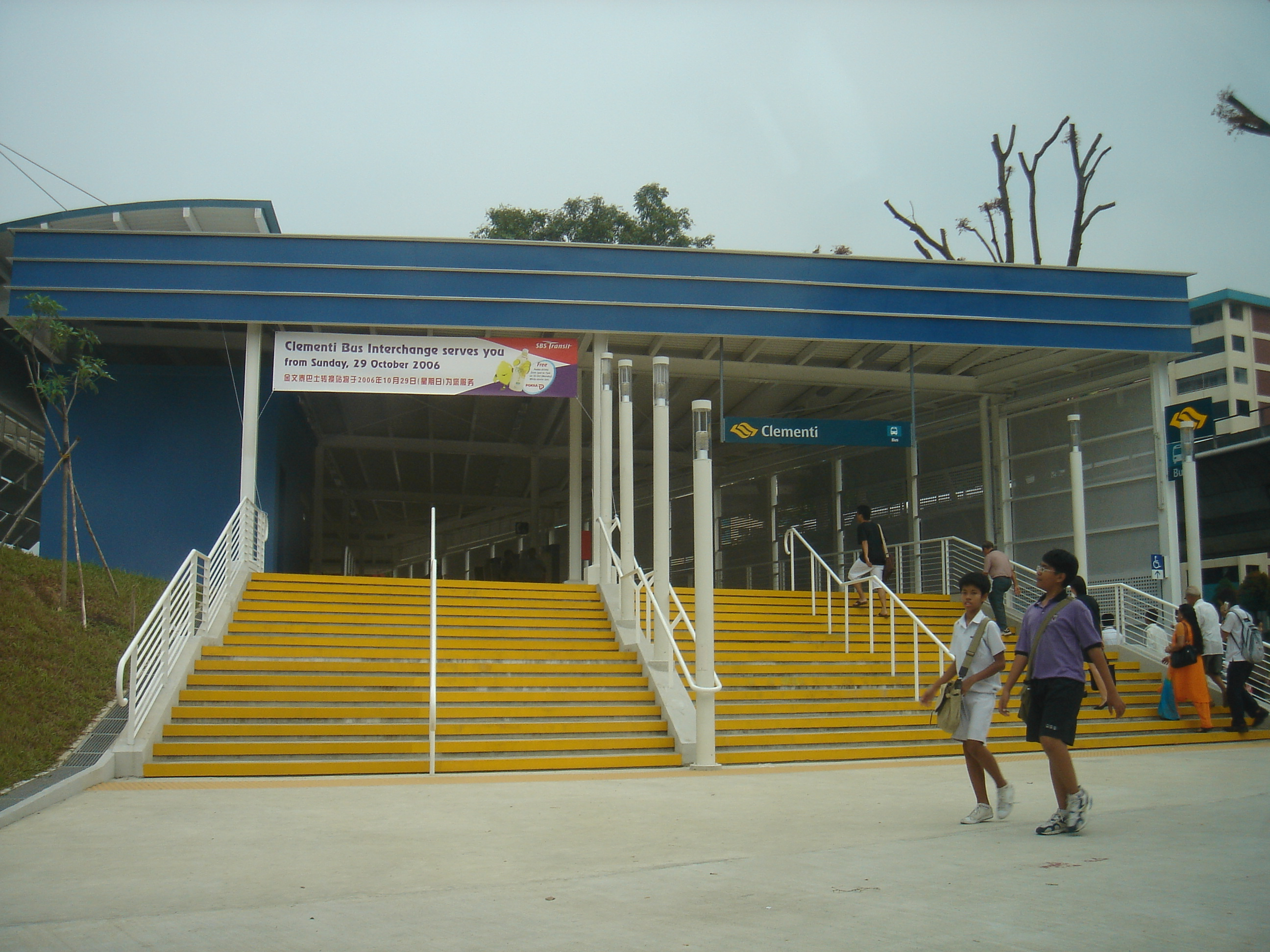
Entrance to the temporary Clementi Bus Interchange which is since the construction site of a new HDB project.

Operations then moved to the temporary facility built across the road at the junction of Commonwealth Avenue West and Clementi Avenue 3 (Land Lot MK05-08585W) on 29 October 2006. This facility was a blue-red-white structure that resembles the original interchange and was used for 5 years and 27 days while the original site was redeveloped into what is known as the new Clementi Town Centre that was planned by HDB which consisted of a new air-conditioned bus interchange, Clementi Mall and 2 HDB flats (Clementi Towers).

The current interchange is an 8,100 square meter facility that opened on 26 November 2011. It is the 6th air conditioned bus interchange in Singapore. Together with Clementi and the nearby commercial developments, it is part of the Clementi Integrated Public Transport Hub.

== Bus contracting model ==
Under the bus contracting model, all bus services operating from Clementi Bus Interchange were divided into four bus packages, operated by two different bus operators.

As the winning bidder for the Bulim bus package in 2015, Tower Transit took over operations for services 96, 173, 282, 284 and 285 from SBS Transit and SMRT Buses in June 2016. Despite Tower Transit operating the feeder bus services from Clementi, SBS Transit is still the principal operator, operating a majority of bus services included in three bus packages. Clementi, Bedok and Sengkang-Hougang.

=== List of bus services ===
Operator	Package	Routes
SBS Transit	Bedok	14, 196
SBS Transit	Clementi	7, 7B, 99, 147, 156, 166, 175
SBS Transit	Sengkang-Hougang	165
Tower Transit Singapore	Bulim	96, 96A, 173, 282, 284, 285
