= Clementi rail accident =

1993 train collision in Singapore

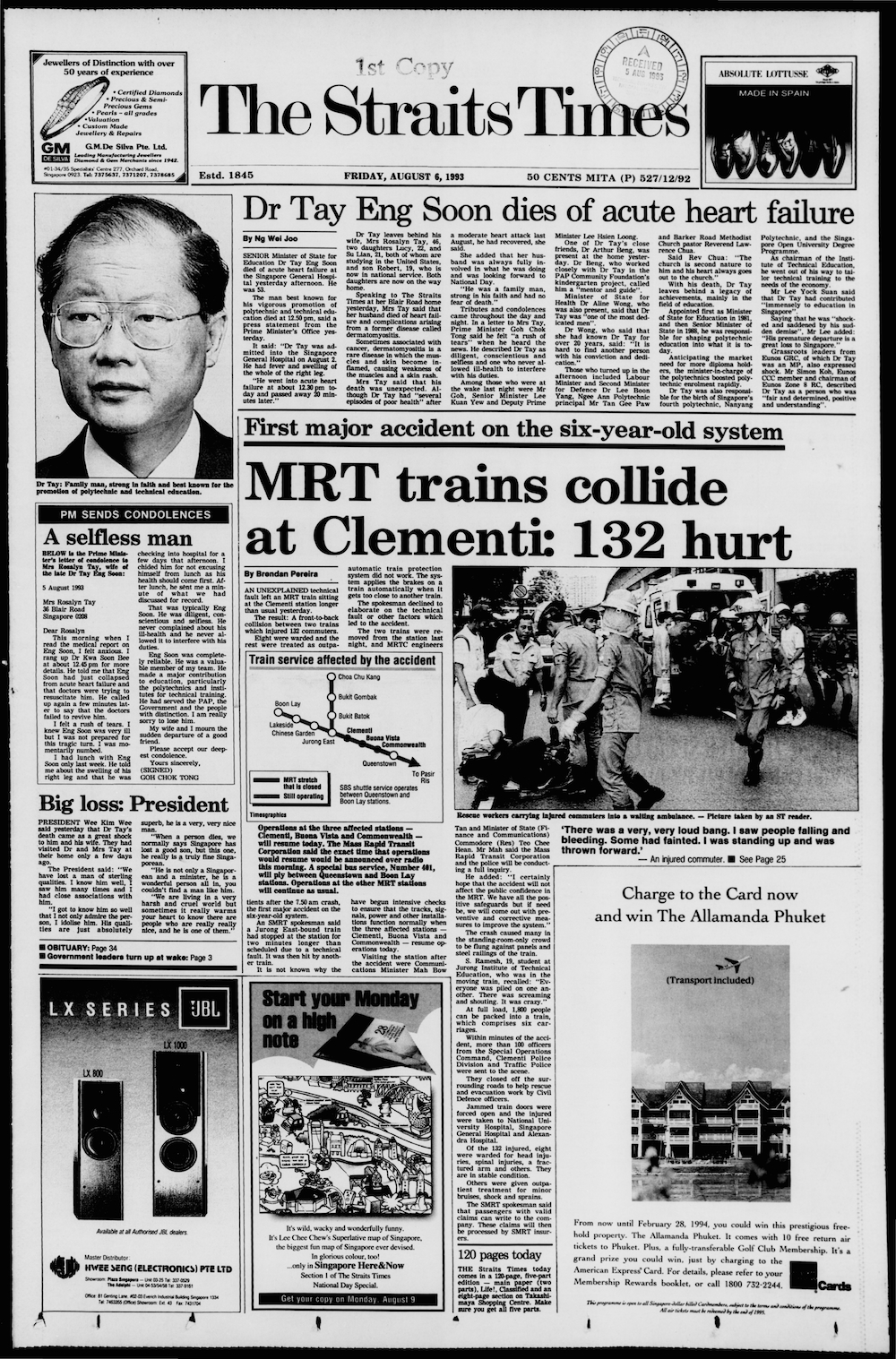
- The Straits Times front page the day after the incident

Details
- Date: 5 August 1993; 33 years ago 07:50 (SST)
- Location: Clementi MRT station
- Coordinates: 1°18′55.09″N 103°45′54.88″E
- Country: Singapore
- Line: East–West Line
- Operator: SMRT Trains
- Incident type: Collision
- Cause: Oil spill leading to reduced braking power

Statistics
- Trains: 2
- Injured: 156

On the morning of 5 August 1993, a C151 electric multiple unit (EMU) train on the East West Line of the Mass Rapid Transit (MRT) rear-ended another stationary train of the same type at Clementi MRT station in Singapore. The incident, the MRT's first major accident, injured 156 passengers but caused no fatalities. Investigations found that the crash was due to a maintenance vehicle that had leaked about 50 litres (11 imp gal; 13 US gal) of oil onto the tracks the previous night.

== Background ==
The MRT network had commenced operations in 1987, with the stretch between Outram Park MRT station and Clementi MRT station opening on 12 March 1988. By the time of the crash in 1993, the system had been in service for six years.

== Incident ==
On 5 August 1993, a locomotive was conducting maintenance work in Clementi station before the start of service. A 60-cent rubber ring broke, resulting in 50 liters (13 U.S. gal) of oil to be spilt across the track. Ten Jurong East-bounded trains reported braking difficulties when stopping at the station, with the eleventh train activating its emergency brakes, and was stationary for two minutes longer than scheduled at Clementi station. At 07:50, an oncoming train then collided front-to-back into the stationary train, injuring 132 commuters. The oncoming train's automatic protection system, which brakes the train when it gets too close to another train, did not work. A witness in the moving train described the accident as "everyone was pilled on one another. There was screaming and shouting. It was crazy". More than 100 officers from the Special Operations Command, Clementi Police Division, and Traffic Police arrived at the site and closed off roads for Civil Defence officers, who opened jammed train doors. Eight people were escorted to the National University Hospital, Singapore General Hospital, or Alexandra Hospital for head injuries, spinal injuries, and other injuries. The trains were removed from the station during the night, and MRTC engineers ran checks on rail, signalling, and power.

== Investigation ==
The MRTC formed a panel board of inquiry, which included Public Works Department deputy director-general Chua Koon Hoe, Public Transport Council deputy chairman Chang Meng Teng, Temasek Polytechnic principal Natarajan Varaprasad, and MRTC general manager Low Tien So. The investigations started on 10 August, and was expected to take a month to complete. Communications minister Mah Bow Tan announced on 19 October 1993 that the investigation was complete. The panel found that station staff could have "sufficiently aggressively or promptly" dealt with the oil spill.

== Aftermath ==
=== Continuation of services ===
Services between Jurong East and Queenstown stations continued the next day. Despite the accident, David Miller of The Straits Times reported that commuters, including those injured in the accident, were confident in the MRT system and regarded the incident as a "freak accident". The number of injured people also rose to 156, with five of the eight hospitalised people discharged.

=== Replacement ===
In the aftermath of the crash, SMRT said that it would replace the faulty maintenance locomotives and purchase new ones. It also introduced a new policy for station managers to inspect tracks for oil or foreign objects before the start of service.

== See also ==
- Joo Koon rail accident
