= Clementi MRT station =

Mass Rapid Transit station in Singapore

Clementi EW23 CR17 金文泰 கிளிமெண்டி
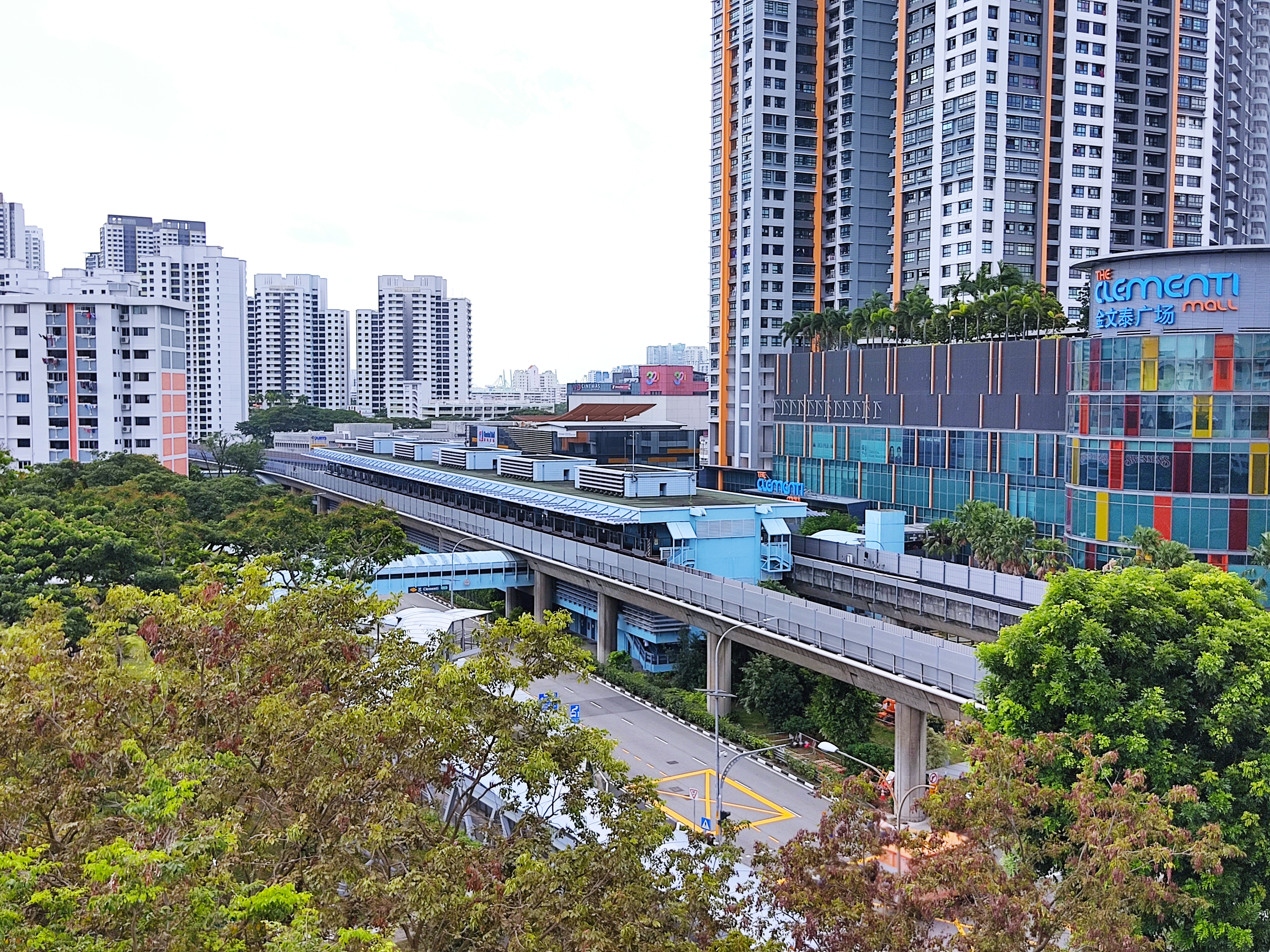
- Exterior of the station

General information
- Location: 3150 Commonwealth Avenue West, Singapore 129580
- Coordinates: 1°18′54″N 103°45′55″E
- System: Mass Rapid Transit (MRT) station
- Owner: Land Transport Authority
- Operator: SMRT Trains (East–West Line)
- Line: East–West Line Cross Island Line
- Platforms: 2 (1 island platform) + 2 (1 island platform) (U/C)
- Tracks: 2
- Connections: Clementi, Taxi

Construction
- Structure type: Elevated (EWL); Underground (CRL)
- Platform levels: 1
- Parking: Yes (Clementi Mall)
- Accessible: Yes

Other information
- Station code: CLE

History
- Opened: 12 March 1988; 38 years ago (East–West Line)
- Opening: 2032; 6 years' time (Cross Island Line)

Passengers
- June 2024: 41,576 per day

Services
Preceding station	Mass Rapid Transit	Following station
Dover towards Pasir Ris	East–West Line	Jurong East towards Tuas Link
Maju towards Aviation Park	Cross Island Line Future service	West Coast towards Jurong Lake District
Track layout
Location
- Location within Singapore Rail

Clementi MRT station is an elevated Mass Rapid Transit (MRT) station on the East–West Line (EWL) in Clementi, Singapore. The station is located along Commonwealth Avenue West and serves landmarks such as the Clementi Mall, Clementi Bus Interchange, and Clementi Fire Station.

Built as part of Phase IA of the MRT system, the station opened on 12 March 1988. An oil spill on the tracks led to two trains colliding at the station on 5 August 1993. The station saw further upgrades, such as new half-height platform doors and fans above the platforms to improve ventilation, as well as new linkways which opened in 2018. In September 2022, it was announced that the station would become an interchange station with the Cross Island Line (CRL) as part of Phase 2 of the line.

== History ==
=== East West Line ===
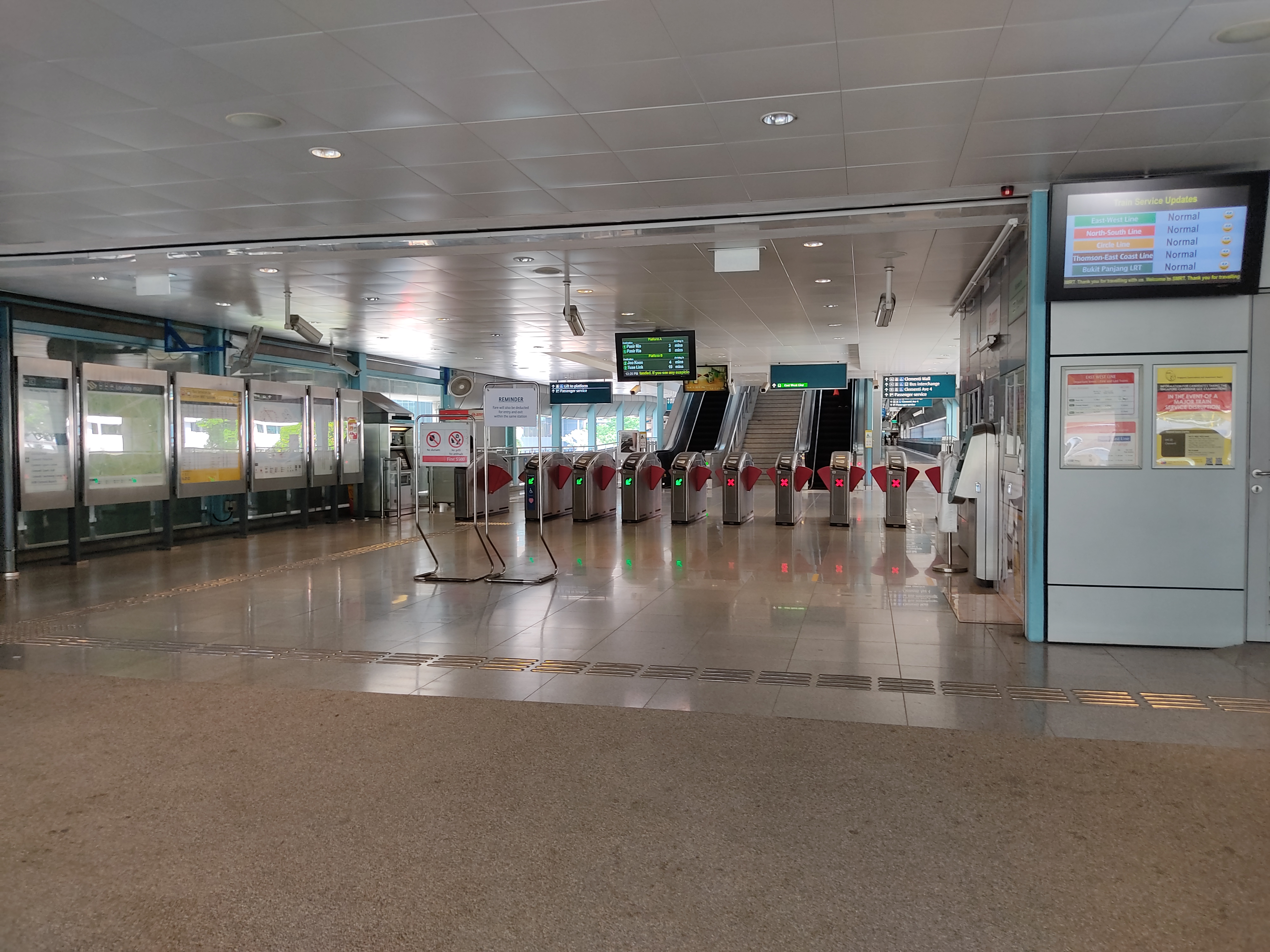
Faregates pictured in 2021

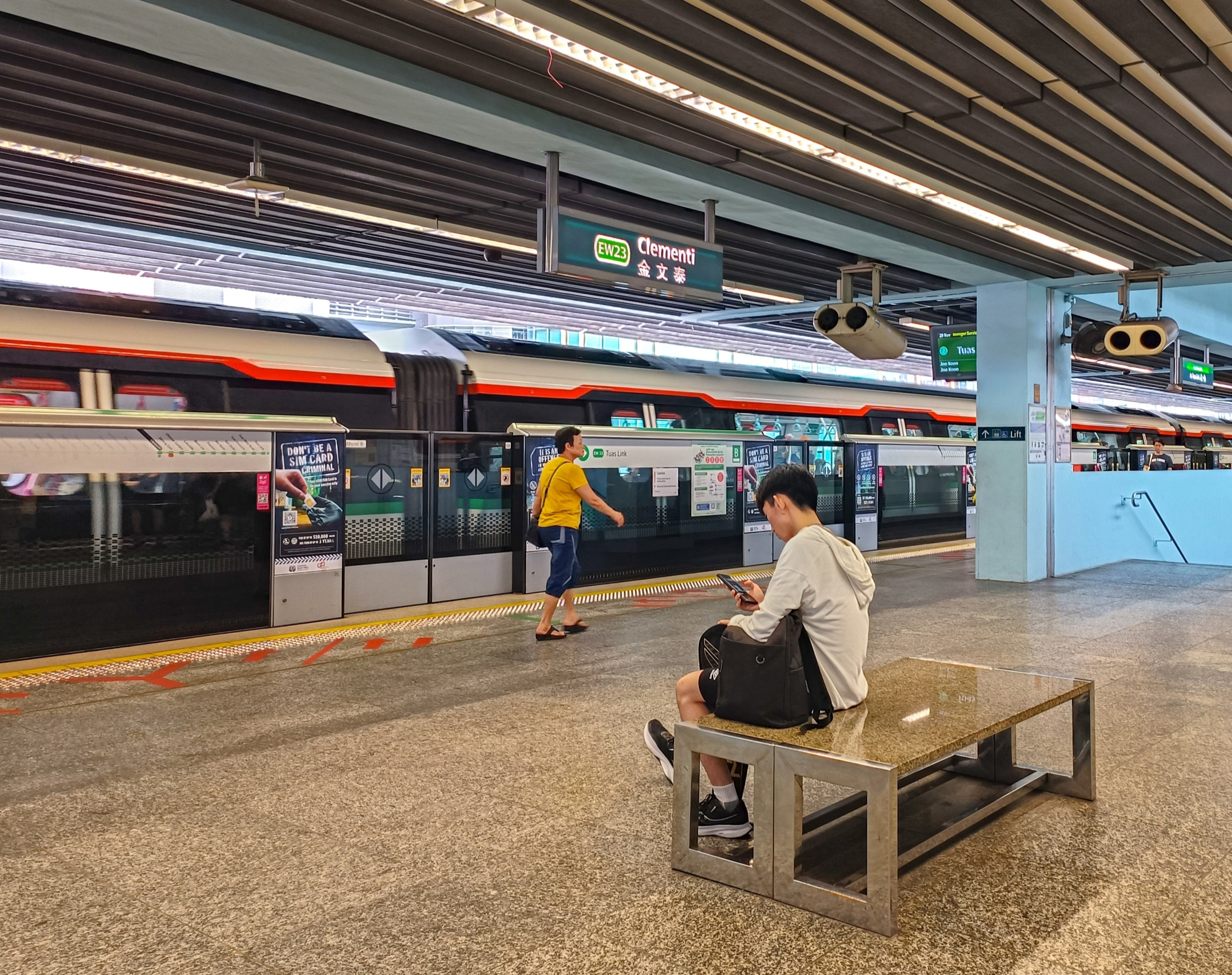
Station Platform

Clementi station was first constructed as part of Phase IA of the MRT system, an 8.5-kilometre (5.3-mile) segment which spans from Tiong Bahru to this station. This segment was initially planned to be built as part of Phase II, but the completion date was pushed earlier to 1988 to increase Phase I's catchment area. The contract for the construction of Clementi station and 2 kilometres (1.2 miles) of viaducts was awarded to a joint venture between Lim Kah Ngam Construction and Aoki Corporation for S$48.7 million (US$66 million in 2022) in April 1985.

The station opened for a public preview on 27 and 28 February 1988, before operations commenced on 12 March that year. On the opening day, Clementi station was the most visited station among the Phase IA stations, with 80,000 recorded trips and 125,618 passengers.

In 2012, half-height platform screen doors was installed at this station as part of the Land Transport Authority's (LTA) programme to improve safety in MRT stations. High-volume low-speed fans were installed above the platforms of the station between 2012 and 2013 as part of a national programme to improve ventilation at station platforms.

Two new link bridges, along with new fare gates and escalators, opened in 2015 to improve connectivity to new flats near the station. Noise barriers were installed along the viaduct stretch from Clementi Road to Clementi station as part of a S$17 million (US$12.7 million) contract awarded to CKT Thomas Pte Ltd in January 2015. Another set of noise barriers from Clementi Avenue 4 to Lempeng Drive were installed from 2018 to 2020.

=== Clementi rail accident ===
On the morning of 5 August 1993, two trains collided at the station after one became stalled at the station due to a technical fault. The crash left 156 people injured, eight of them seriously. The trains were taken out of service while engineers conducted checks on signalling equipment at the Clementi, Buona Vista, and Commonwealth stations. MRT operations resumed the next day. For further engineering checks between the Buona Vista and Clementi stations, trains at Buona Vista were not allowed to depart until the train at Clementi left; this restriction was lifted on 8 August.

An independent inquiry panel concluded that a damaged maintenance locomotive spilled oil on the tracks the morning of the crash. While workers were aware of the spill, the cleaning crew were delayed from accessing the tracks. Ten trains had experienced braking issues leading up to the crash. The stalled train used its emergency brakes to stop at Clementi station and needed to recharge its brake systems before moving off. The automatic braking system of the subsequent train failed to prevent the collision. As MRT staff had followed procedures, none faced disciplinary action as a result of the crash. The inquiry recommended increased inspections of locomotives and for the station master to look out for oil spills on tracks.

=== Cross Island line ===
The station was first announced to interchange with the Cross Island line (CRL) on 20 September 2022 by Transport Minister S Iswaran. The CRL platforms will be constructed as part of CRL Phase 2, a 15-kilometre (9.3 mi) segment spanning six stations from Turf City to Jurong Lake District station. The station is expected to be completed in 2032.

The contract for the construction of Clementi CRL station was awarded to a joint venture between China Communications Construction Company Limited (Singapore Branch) and Sinohydro Corporation Limited (Singapore Branch) for S$514 million (US$383.58 million) in October 2023. Construction of the new station was scheduled to begin in 2024 and be completed in 2032. To facilitate the construction of the new CRL station, the Clementi police headquarters and the neighbourhood police centre were relocated to Lempeng Drive. The contract for the construction of tunnels between this station and Maju station was awarded to Sinohydro Corporation Limited (Singapore Branch) for S$199 million (US$148.51 million) in August 2024. Construction of CRL Phase 2 officially began on 7 July 2025 with a groundbreaking ceremony at this station.

== Station details ==
Clementi station serves the EWL and is between the Jurong East and Dover stations. The official station code is EW23. When it opened, it had the station code of W8 before being changed to its current station code in August 2001 as a part of a system-wide campaign to cater to the expanding MRT System. Being part of the EWL, the station is operated by SMRT Trains. The station will be a future interchange station with the CRL. The station is located along Commonwealth Avenue West and has four entrances. Surrounding landmarks of the station include the Clementi Mall, Clementi Bus Interchange, Clementi Fire Station, Clementi Polyclinic, Masjid Darussalam, and Clementi Primary School.

A mural, Echoes of Clementi by Ashley Goh Yu Ting, is displayed at this station as part of SMRT's Comic Connect – a public art showcase of heritage-themed murals. Commemorating Clementi's multicultural communities and its development from a kampung into a town hub, the work depicts Clementi's various landmarks and flora and fauna that remains in the new town.

== See also ==
- 2024 East–West Line disruption
