= Dover MRT station =

Mass Rapid Transit station in Singapore

Dover EW22 杜弗 டோவெர்
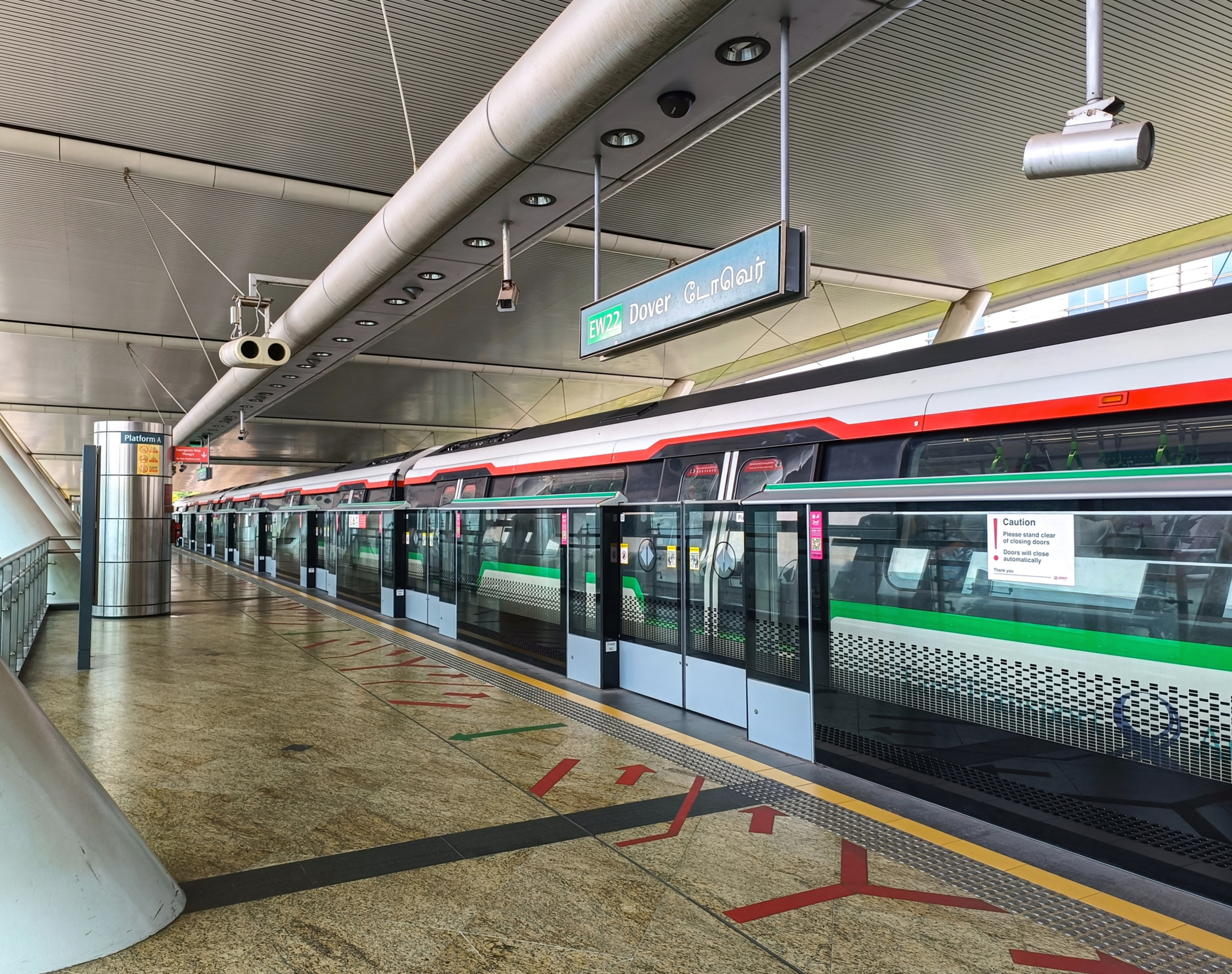
- Platform A of Dover station

General information
- Location: 200 Commonwealth Avenue West; Singapore 138677
- Coordinates: 1°18′41″N 103°46′43″E
- System: Mass Rapid Transit (MRT) station
- Operator: SMRT Trains Ltd (SMRT Corporation)
- Line: East–West Line
- Platforms: 2 (2 side platforms)
- Tracks: 2
- Connections: Bus, Taxi

Construction
- Structure type: Elevated
- Platform levels: 1
- Parking: Yes (Singapore Polytechnic)
- Cycle facilities: Yes
- Accessible: Yes
- Architect: RSP Architects Planners & Engineers

History
- Opened: 18 October 2001; 25 years ago
- Former names: Singapore Polytechnic

Passengers
- June 2024: 7929 per day

Services
Preceding station	Mass Rapid Transit	Following station
Buona Vista towards Pasir Ris	East–West Line	Clementi towards Tuas Link
Track layout
Location
- Location within Singapore Rail

Dover MRT station is an elevated Mass Rapid Transit (MRT) station on the East–West Line (EWL) in Singapore. Located along Commonwealth Avenue West, the station is directly linked to Singapore Polytechnic and serves various residential developments in the area. The station is operated by SMRT Trains.

The station was first planned in 1988 before construction of the station was announced in 1997. The first infill station on the MRT network, contractors had to ensure safety without disrupting services on the EWL, which included building a temporary steel tunnel over the tracks. The station opened on 18 October 2001. Designed by RSP Architects Planners & Engineers, the station has a distinctive arched roof supported by steel columns and floor-to-ceiling glass panels along the concourse.

== History ==
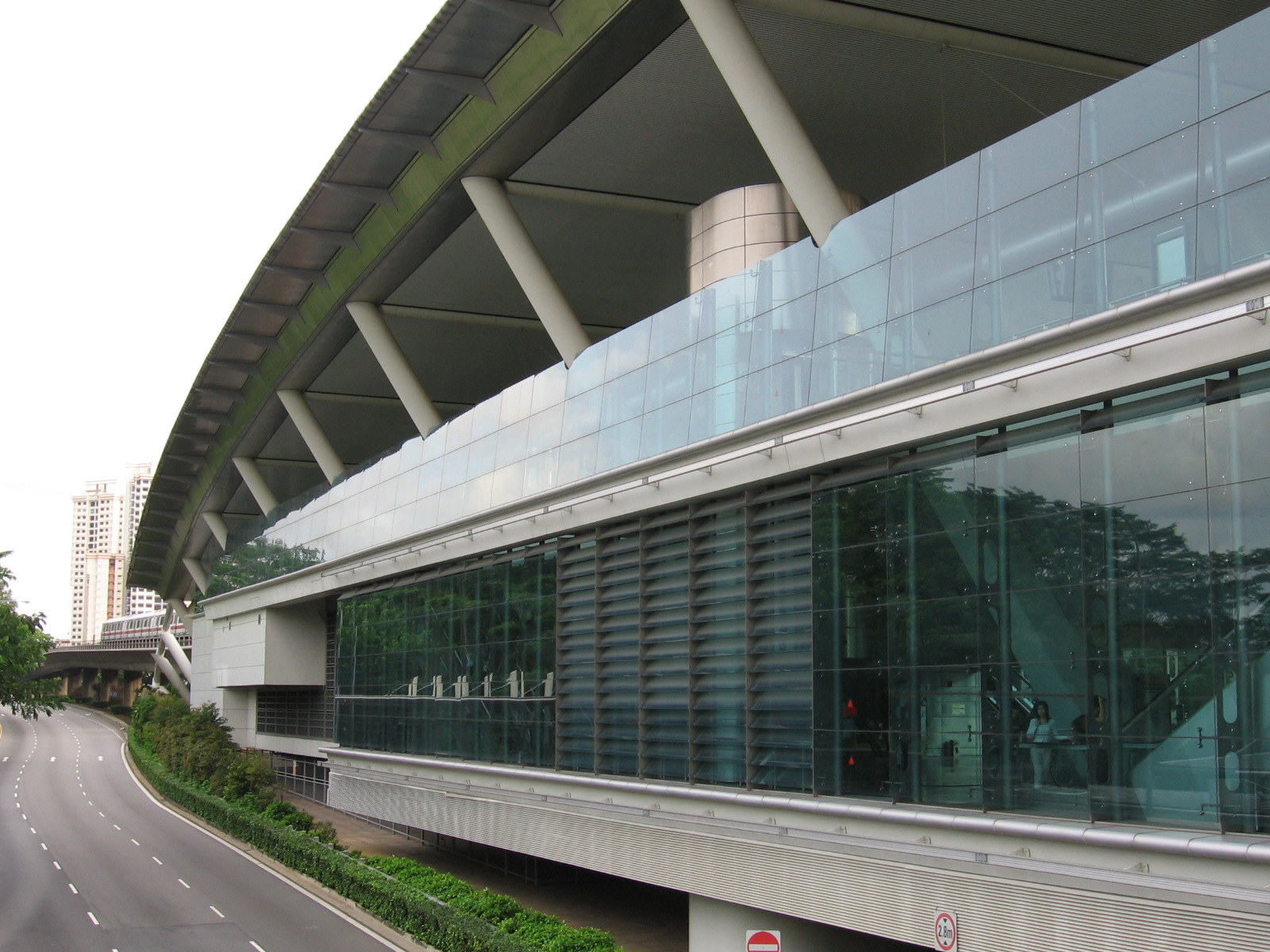
Exterior of Dover station

The East–West Line (EWL) segment from Tiong Bahru to Clementi station opened on 12 March 1988. Plans for a station between Buona Vista and Clementi to serve Singapore Polytechnic were first announced by Mass Rapid Transit Corporation general manager Colin Cray in May 1988. The station was not built due to projections of low ridership. On 28 July 1997, Communications Minister Mah Bow Tan announced that the station would be built, with a completion date of 2001. However, some residents criticised the plans, saying the station was expensive and unnecessary since the area was sufficiently served by existing bus services. They also objected that the infill station would increase travel time on the EWL. On the other hand, the Land Transport Authority (LTA) said the station would serve the enlarged student body at Singapore Polytechnic and relieve traffic congestion around the area.

As the station, then named Singapore Polytechnic, was the first to be built on an operational MRT line, contractors had to ensure safety without disrupting services on the EWL. Trains slowed down when approaching the station site. A temporary steel tunnel, assembled by a hydraulic crane, was built over the tracks to prevent debris from falling onto the tracks. The tunnels were also supported by a reinforced steel structure that would also support the station's platforms and concourse. Some lanes of Commonwealth Avenue West were closed and traffic was diverted to the service road in Singapore Polytechnic. Most of the construction took place at night to minimise noise near the polytechnic using smaller piling machines.

When Minister of State John Chen visited the station on 4 October 2001, he announced it would open on the 18th of that month. From 13 to 17 October, trains stopped at the station with in-train announcements as part of trial tests. An official opening ceremony was held on 23 October.

In 2012, half-height platform screen doors were installed at this station as part of the LTA's programme to improve safety in MRT stations. High-volume low-speed fans were installed above the platforms of the station between 2012 and 2013 as part of a national programme to improve ventilation at station platforms.

== Details ==
Dover station serves the EWL of the Singapore MRT and is between the Buona Vista and Clementi stations. The official station code is EW22. Being part of the EWL, the station is operated by SMRT Trains. The station was named after the nearby Dover Road. Dover station is located along Commonwealth Avenue West and is directly linked to Singapore Polytechnic via a linkbridge. The station also serves the School of Science & Technology and New Town Secondary School. Other nearby residential developments include Fontana Heights and Marbella Condo. The station will also serve future developments in Dover Forest.

The station was designed by RSP Architects Planners & Engineers. At a height of 21 metres (69 ft), the three-level station has an arched metal roof supported by stainless steel columns to give a more spacious interior. The station concourse level was clad in floor-to-ceiling glass panels. Unlike most MRT stations, Dover station has a side platform configuration. Dover is one of the first MRT stations to be wheelchair-accessible; it has been retrofitted with lifts and ramps for barrier-free access. A tactile flooring system, consisting of tiles with raised, rounded-or-elongated studs, guides visually impaired commuters through the station.
