= Greenfield project =

Project that is built up from scratch

In many disciplines, a greenfield project is one that lacks constraints imposed by prior work. The analogy is to that of construction on greenfield land where there is no need to work within the constraints of existing buildings or infrastructure.

== Software development ==
In software development, a greenfield project may involve developing a system for a wholly new environment, without concern for integrating with other systems, especially legacy systems. Such projects are deemed higher risk, as they are often for new infrastructure, customers or owners. Greenfield projects offer an opportunity for free innovation and creation from scratch.

== Cell phone networks ==
In wireless engineering, a greenfield project could be that of rolling out a new generation of cell phone networks. The first cellular telephone networks were built primarily on tall existing tower structures or on high ground in an effort to cover as much territory as possible in as little time as possible and with a minimum number of base stations. These early wireless telephone network designs were later augmented with additional base stations and antennas to handle the growing demand for additional voice traffic and higher network capacity. As wireless networks quickly evolved, it was evident that the earlier designs constrained the growth of the network. As governments made more radio spectrum available for licensed wireless telephone operators in the late 1980s, entirely new networks were built that performed better than legacy networks because their designs were free from the constraints of existing systems. Today, any new network designed from scratch to enable new Radio Access Network technologies, such as 3G, 4G, and WiMAX, is also referred to as a greenfield project.

== Other uses ==
Literal examples of greenfield projects are new factories, power plants, airports which are built from scratch on greenfield land. Those facilities which are modified/upgraded are called brownfield land projects (often the pre-existing site/facilities are contaminated/polluted.)

In transportation industries (e.g., automotive, aircraft, engines) the equivalent concept is called "clean sheet design".

Greenfield also has meaning in sales. A greenfield opportunity refers to a marketplace that is completely untapped and free for the taking.

From an Information Technology Service Management (ITSM) perspective, an IT organization that is being set up from scratch is said to start from a "greenfield" situation. This is because it would have no live services or practices in place to start with.

== See also ==
- Brownfield (software development)
- Brownfield land
- Greenfield land
- Greenfield agreement
- Greyfield land
- Blue skies research
