= Greenfield agreement =

Agreement between a union and a new employer, that does not yet have employees

A Greenfield agreement is an agreement between a union and a new employer that does not yet have employees..

This has a number of benefits for the employer. A key advantage is that a greenfield agreement does not require the approval of any employees whose employment would be subject to the agreement. Basically, there are no employees to negotiate with. Another key benefit is that a greenfield agreement provides an employer with the opportunity to shut out less desirable unions as parties and therefore effectively having a presence at the new business before the employment of any employees.

Greenfield agreements must involve a genuinely new enterprise; a business cannot simply initiate a new project and use this as grounds to negotiate a greenfield agreement.

== See also ==
- Greenfield land
- Greenfield project
- Greenfield investment
