= Mass Rapid Transit (Singapore) =

Principal metro system serving Singapore

Mass Rapid Transit (MRT)

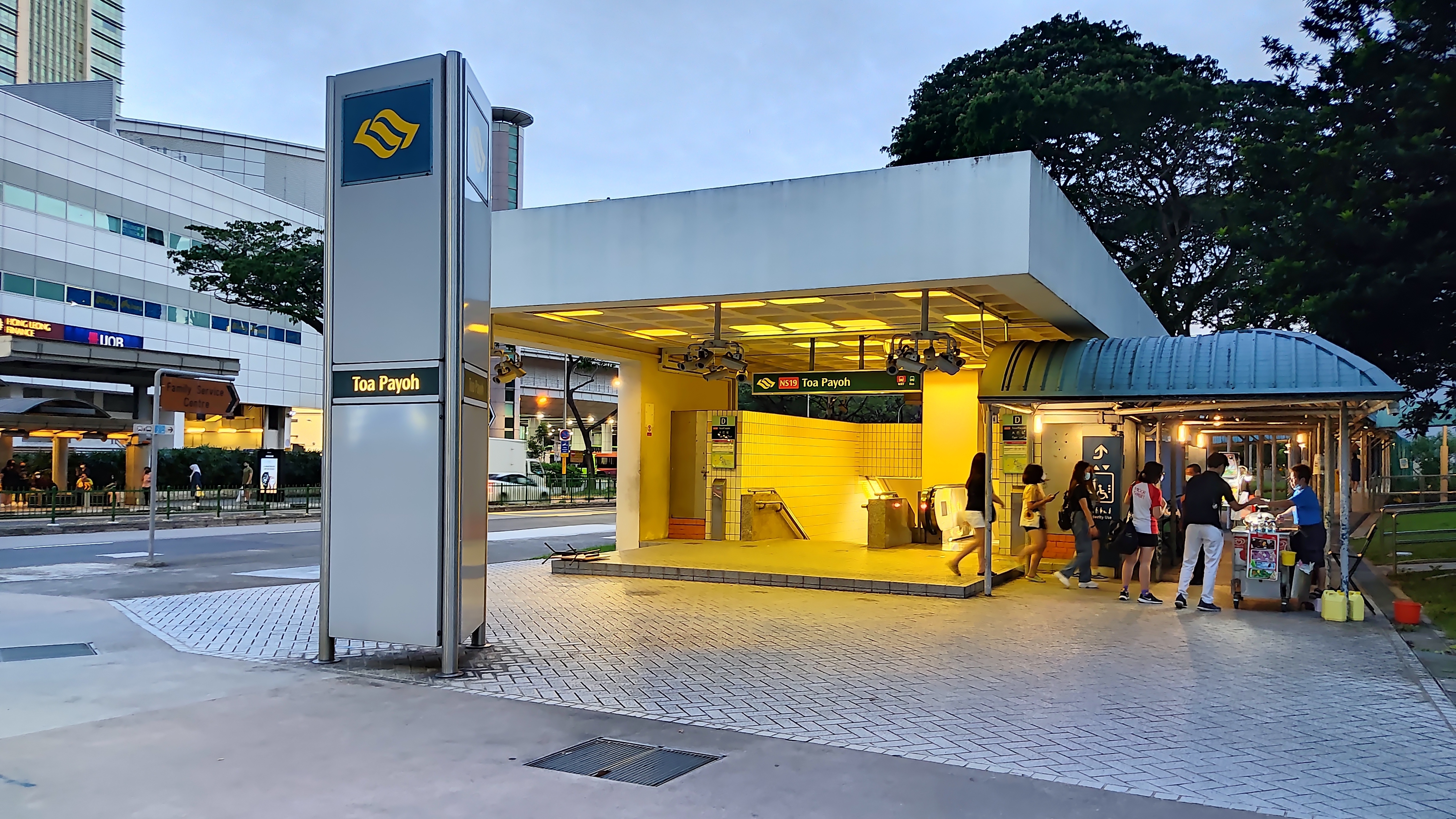
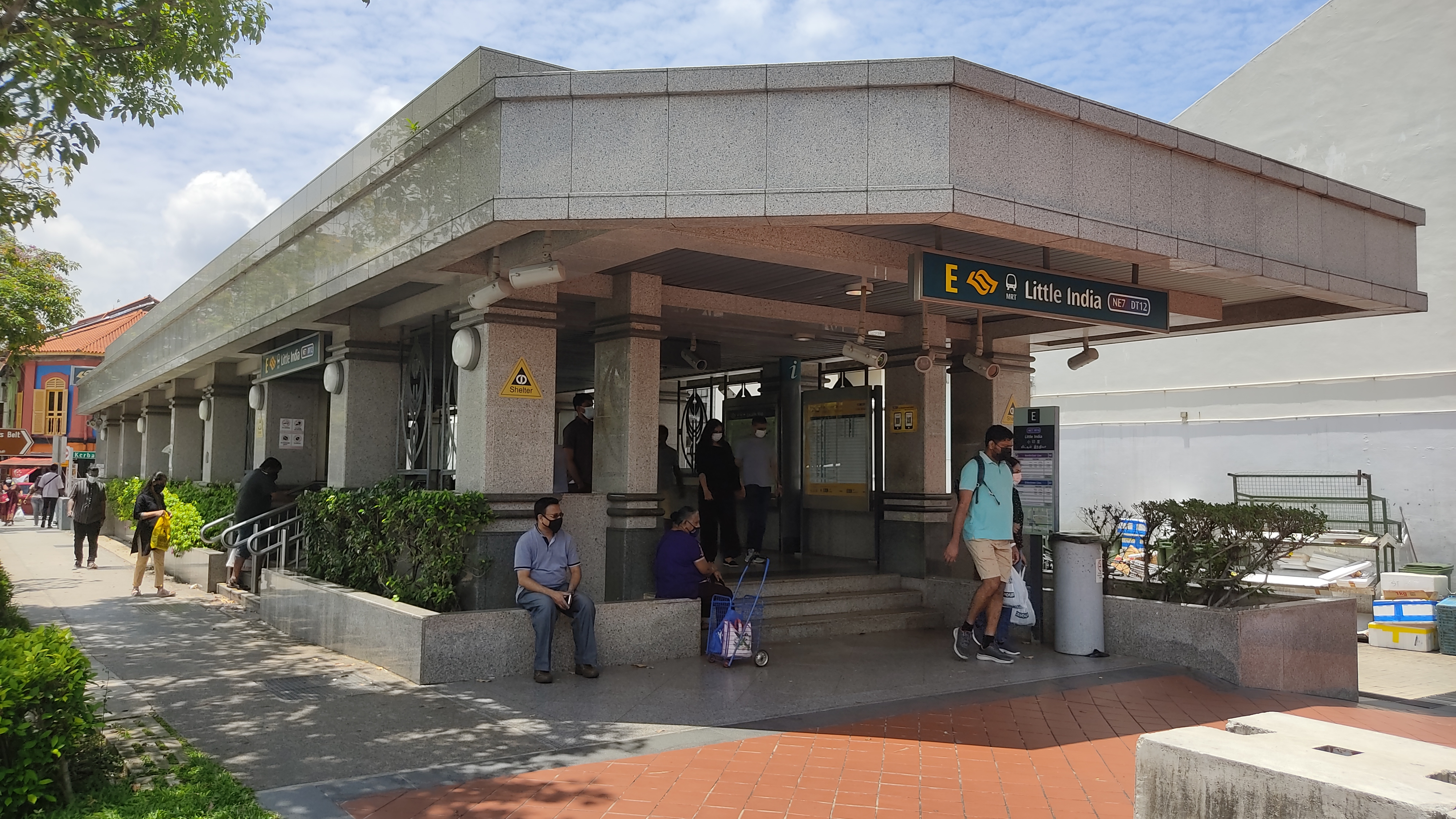
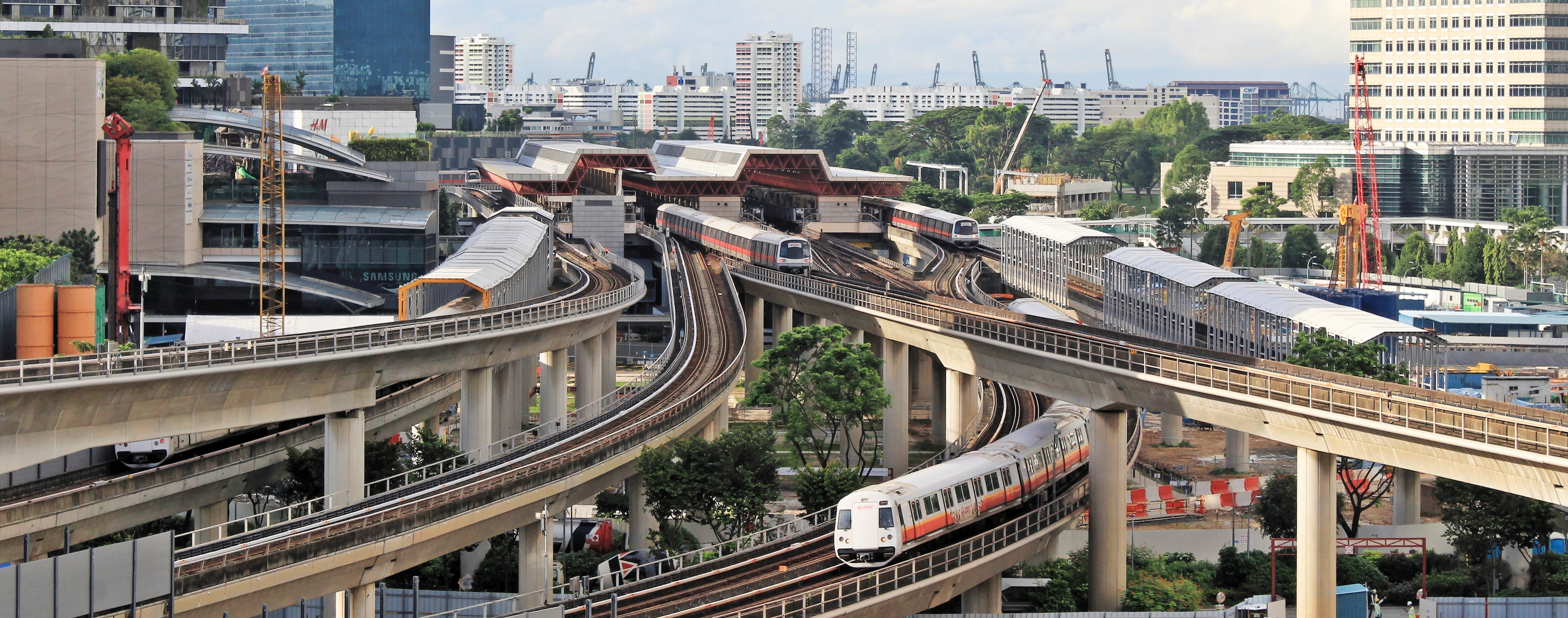
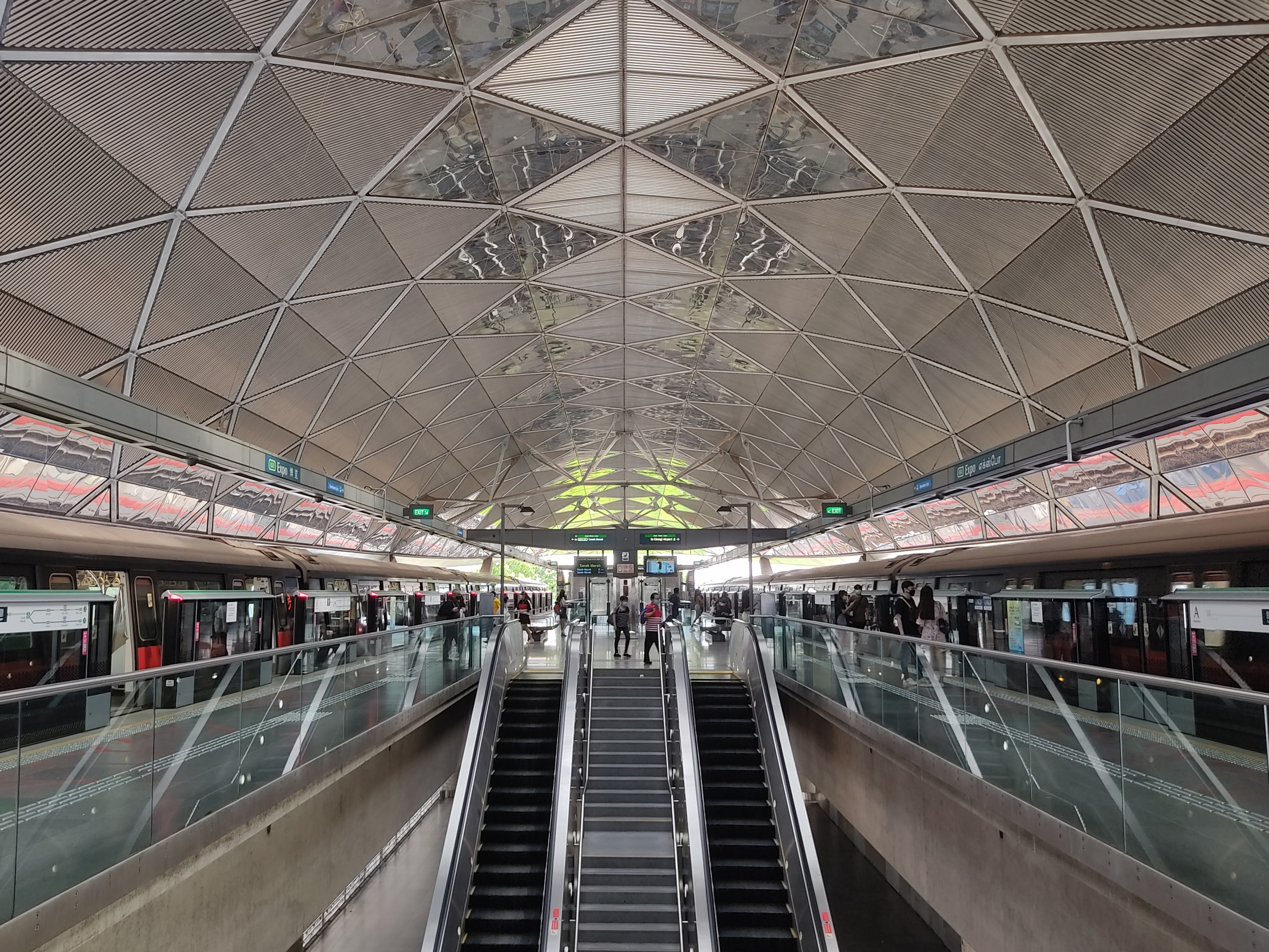
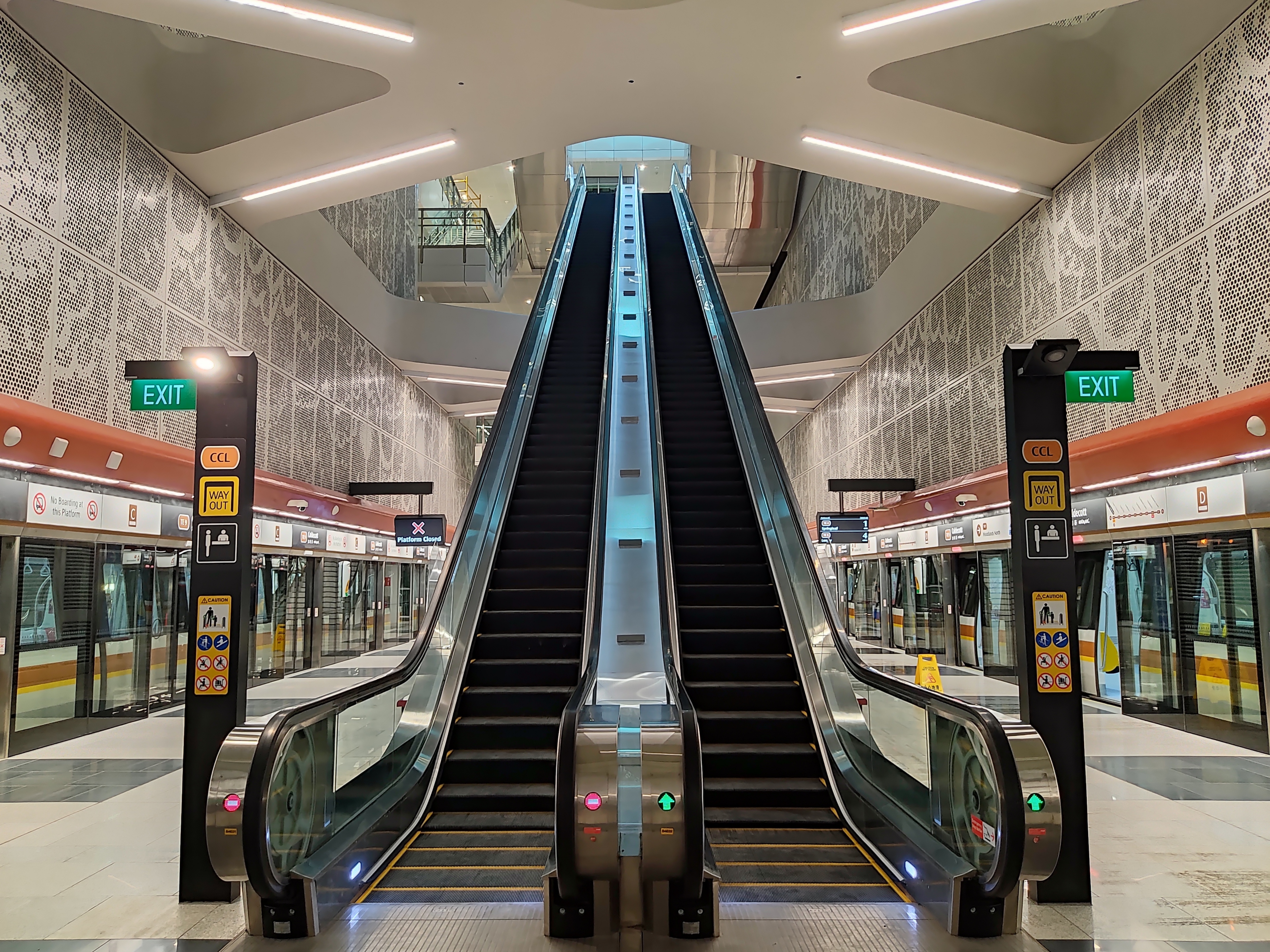
- From top, left to right: Entrances of the Toa Payoh, Little India stations; Exterior of Jurong East station; East–West Line (EWL) platforms at Expo station and Thomson–East Coast Line platforms at Caldecott station

Overview
- Native name: Pengangkutan Gerak Cepat (Malay) 新加坡地铁系统 (Chinese) சிங்கப்பூர் பெருவிரைவு ரயில் (Tamil)
- Owner: Land Transport Authority
- Locale: Singapore
- Transit type: Rapid transit
- Number of lines: 8 (Note: 6 in operation, 2 under construction.)
- Number of stations: 146 (Note: 146 in operation, 49 under construction or planning, 2 reserved. 167 in operation, if interchange stations are counted as double or triple.)
- Daily ridership: 3.5 million (2025)
- Website: SMRT; SBS Transit

Operation
- Began operation: 7 November 1987; 39 years ago
- Operators: SMRT Trains; SBS Transit
- Character: Fully grade separated
- Number of vehicles: ~623 trains (Note: 474 trains in operation, 16 older trains to be decommissioned by Q3 2025 and replaced with 36 newer equivalents, 129 additional trains on order.) comprising >2,800 carriages (Note: 2,194 passenger carriages in operation, 96 older passenger carriages to be decommissioned by Q3 2025 and replaced with 216 newer equivalents, 519 additional passenger carriages on order, at least 31 railway maintenance vehicles in operation.)
- Train length: 3–8 carriages (Note: 3-carriage configuration: Circle Line, Downtown Line, Jurong Region Line (minimum) 4-carriage configuration: Thomson–East Coast Line, Jurong Region Line (maximum) 6-carriage configuration: North–South Line, East–West Line, North East Line, Cross Island Line 8-carriage configuration: Cross Island Line (maximum))
- Headway: Peak: 1–3 minutes Off-peak: 5–7 minutes

Technical
- System length: 246.6 km (153.2 mi)
- Track gauge: 1,435 mm (4 ft 8 1/2 in) standard gauge
- Minimum radius of curvature: 400–500 m (1,312.34–1,640.42 ft) (mainline), 190 m (623.36 ft) (depot)
- Electrification: 750 V DC third rail (Note: North–South Line, East–West Line, Circle Line, Downtown Line, Thomson–East Coast Line, Jurong Region Line); 1,500 V DC overhead catenary (Note: North East Line (HarbourFront to Punggol)); 1,500 V DC overhead conductor rail (Note: North East Line (Punggol Coast), Cross Island Line)
- Top speed: 80–90 km/h (50–56 mph) (service); 90–100 km/h (56–62 mph) (design)
MRT network map

The Mass Rapid Transit (MRT) is a rapid transit system in Singapore and the island country's principal mode of railway transportation. After two decades of planning, the system commenced operations in November 1987 with an initial 6 km (3.7 mi) stretch consisting of five stations. The network has since grown to span the length and breadth of the country's main island – with the exception of the forested core and the rural northwestern region – in accordance with Singapore's aim of developing a comprehensive rail network as the backbone of the country's public transportation system, (Note: Singapore's heavy rail network is composed of three distinct systems. Two of the three are rapid transit networks, chiefly a) the MRT system, which falls entirely within the city-state and forms the core of the network, and b) the two-station cross-border Johor Bahru–Singapore rapid transit system (RTS), linked to the mainline MRT and due to commence operations in end-2026, and c) the currently-operational cross-border intercity service at Woodlands Train Checkpoint, which may close down its operations once the RTS is complete.) averaging a daily ridership of 3.49 million in 2025.

The MRT network encompasses approximately 246.6 km (153.2 mi) of grade-separated route on standard gauge. As of July 2026, there are 146 operational stations (Note: 30 of which are interchange stations.) dispersed across six operational lines arrayed in a circle-radial topology. Two more lines and 44 stations are currently under construction, in addition to ongoing extension works on existing lines. In total, this will schedule the network to double in length to about 460 km (290 mi) by 2040. Further studies are ongoing on potential new alignments and lines, as well as infill stations in the Land Transport Authority's (LTA) Land Transport Masterplan 2040. The island-wide heavy rail network interchanges with a series of automated guideway transit networks localised to select suburban towns — collectively known as the Light Rail Transit (LRT) system — which, along with public buses, complement the mainline by providing a last mile link between MRT stations and HDB public housing estates. (Note: The network is additionally scheduled to interchange with the Johor Bahru–Singapore Rapid Transit System (RTS Link), that will traverse across the international maritime border of the Straits of Johor, linking northern Singapore and the southern Malaysian city of Johor Bahru via a rapid transit service.)

The MRT is the oldest, busiest, and most comprehensive heavy rail metro system in Southeast Asia. Capital expenditure on its rail infrastructure reached a cumulative S$150 billion in 2021, making the network one of the world's costliest on both a per-kilometre and absolute basis. (Note: NSL and EWL: >S$13.68 billion NEL: S$4.8 billion CCL: >S$15.67 billion DTL: S$20.73 billion TEL: >S$25.0 billion JRL (partial): S$3.759 billion CRL1 (partial): S$4.99 billion Rolling stock: S$6.04 billion Additional depots and facilities: S$5.05 billion Total expenditure on rail infrastructure, procurement of rolling stock and other rail assets, periodical renewal of assets as of September 2021: >S$99.727 billion (not adjusted for inflation) Earmarked aggregate cost for remainder of JRL, remainder of CRL1, CRL2, CRL rolling stock, DTL3 extension, additional civil defence shelters, additional underground spaces, noise barriers, signalling simulation facilities: S$47.008 billion Grand total: >S$146.735 billion) The system operates under a semi-nationalised hybrid regulatory framework. Construction and procurement are overseen by the Land Transport Authority (LTA), a statutory board of the government, which grants operating concessions to the for-profit operators SMRT and SBS Transit. SMRT is a state-owned enterprise under Temasek, while SBS Transit is owned by the public company ComfortDelGro. These operators are responsible for asset maintenance on their respective lines, and also run bus services, facilitating operational synchronicity and the horizontal integration of the broader public transportation network.

The MRT is fully automated and has an extensive driverless rapid transit system. Asset renewal works are periodically carried out to modernise the network and ensure its continued reliability; all stations feature platform barriers with MRT stations also having platform screen doors, Wi-Fi connectivity, lifts, climate control, and accessibility provisions, among others. Much of the early network is elevated above ground on concrete viaducts, with a small portion running at-grade; newer lines are largely subterranean, incorporating several of the lengthiest continuous subway tunnel sections in the world. A number of underground stations double as purpose-built air raid shelters under the operational authority of the Singapore Civil Defence Force (SCDF); these stations incorporate deep-level station boxes cast with hardened concrete and blast doors fashioned out of reinforced steel to withstand conventional aerial and chemical ordnance.

== History ==
=== Planning and inception ===
The origins of the Mass Rapid Transit (MRT) were derived from a forecast by the country's planners back in 1967 which stated the need for a rail-based urban transport system by 1992.

In 1972, a study was conducted by the American firms Wilbur Smith and Associates, Parsons Brinckerhoff (now WSP USA), Tudor, and Bechtel, which was accounted for by the World Bank on behalf of the United Nations Development Programme. The study was undertaken for eight years, including the phases of the study in 1974 and 1977. In 1979, to prepare the third phase of the study, Halcrow, a British firm, was appointed to craft the system; meanwhile, a third phase of the study was published in 1981.

However, opposition from the government on the feasibility of the MRT from prominent ministers, among them Finance Minister Goh Keng Swee and Trades and Industry Minister Tony Tan, nearly shuttered the programme on financial grounds and concerns of jobs saturation in the construction industry. Dr Goh instead endorsed the idea of an all-bus system recommended by Harvard University specialists, who argued this would reduce the cost by 50% compared to the proposed MRT system. Public opinion was split on the matter: several expressed concerns about the high cost while others were more focused on increasing the standard of living. Following a debate on whether a bus-only system would be more cost-effective, Communications Minister Ong Teng Cheong came to the conclusion that an all-bus system would be inadequate, as it would have to compete for road space in a land-scarce country. Ong was an architect and town planner by training and through his perseverance and dedication became the main figure behind the initial construction of the system.

An MRT System Designs Option Study was also conducted to refine the technical details and the recommended measures for the MRT system - these include:

- Third rail is to standardise with many metros in the world instead of overhead rail in many railways of the world and MTR.
- Mandatory to have platform screen doors for safety and ventilation reasons, starting from underground stations and later on extended to elevated and surface stations.

Parsons Brinckerhoff and SOFRETU, a French firm, undertook the design options study.

=== Construction begins ===
Singapore's MRT infrastructure is built, operated, and managed in accordance with a hybridised quasi-nationalised regulatory framework called the New Rail Financing Framework (NRFF), in which the lines are constructed and the assets owned by the Land Transport Authority, a statutory board of the Government of Singapore.

Opening of the various stages (1987–1990)

The network was planned to be constructed and opened in stages, even as plans had already indicated the decision for two main arterial lines. The North–South Line was given priority because it passed through the Central Area that has a high demand for public transport. De Leuw Cather was appointed to undertake a two-year contract for consultancy in November 1982. The Mass Rapid Transit Corporation (MRTC)—later renamed SMRT Corporation—was established on 14 October 1983 and took over the roles and responsibilities of the former provisional Mass Rapid Transit Authority. On 7 November 1987, the first section of the North–South Line started operations, consisting of five stations over six kilometres. Within a year, 20 more stations had been added to the network and a direct service existed between Yishun and Lakeside stations, linking up Central Singapore to Jurong in the west by the end of 1988. The direct service was eventually split into the North–South and East–West Lines after the latter's completion of the eastern sector to Tanah Merah station. By the end of 1990, the Branch line had further linked Choa Chu Kang to the network while the inauguration of Boon Lay station on 6 July 1990 marked the completion of the initial system two years ahead of schedule.

=== Subsequent expansions ===
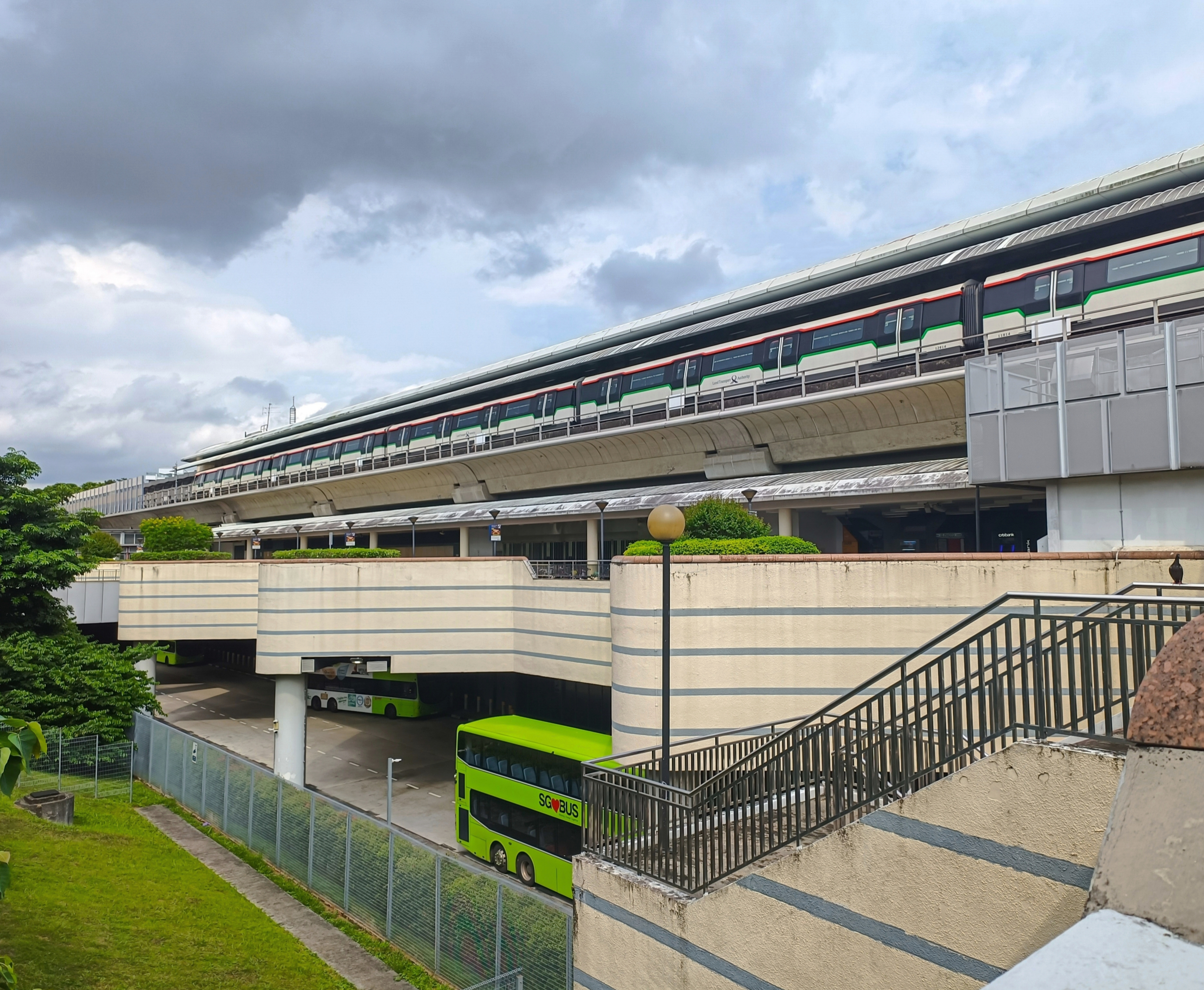
Woodlands station

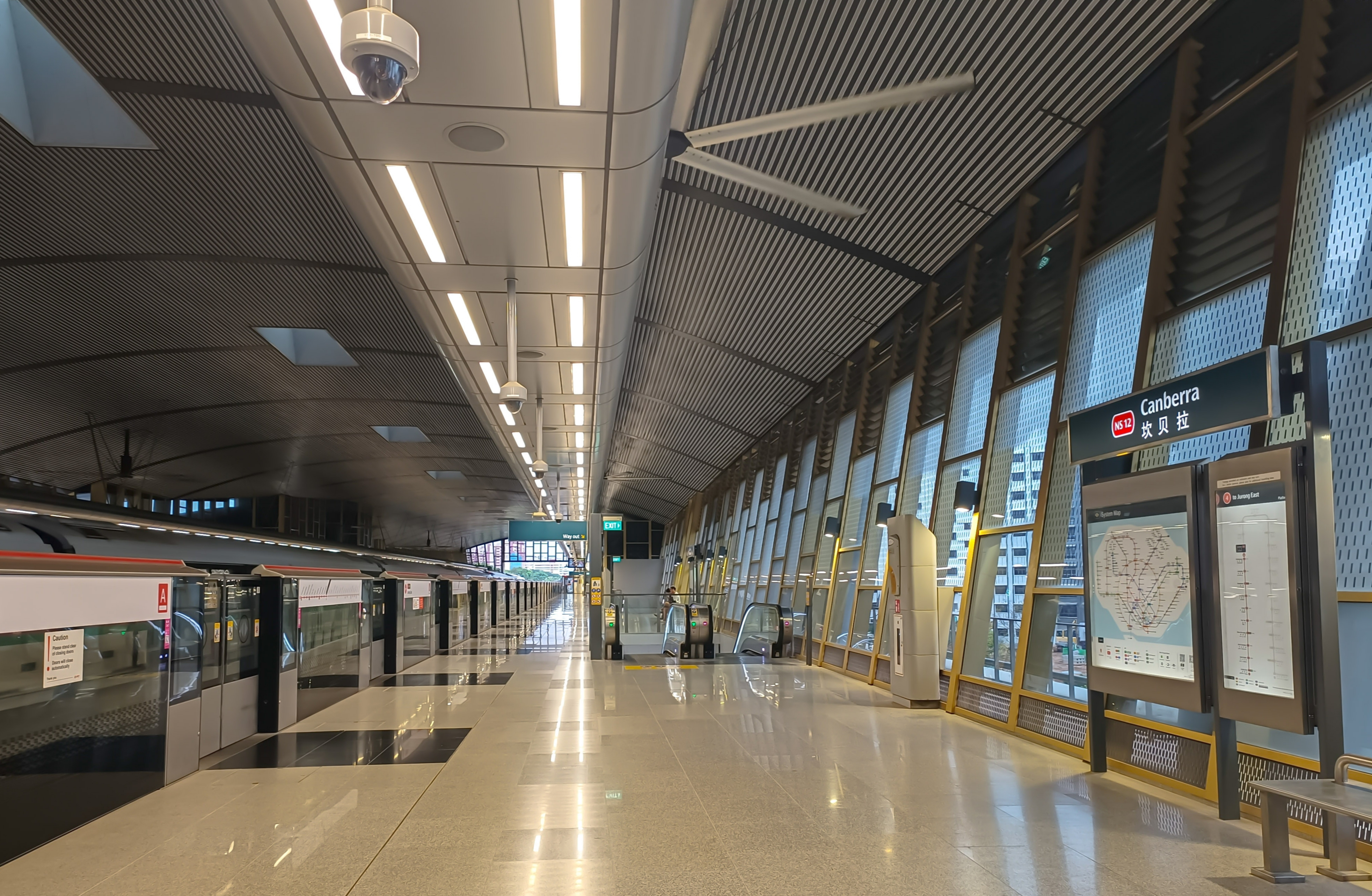
Canberra station, an infill station of the North–South Line

The MRT has been continuously expanded ever since. On 10 February 1996, a S$1.2 billion expansion of the North–South Line into Woodlands was completed, merging the Branch Line into the North–South Line and joining Yishun and Choa Chu Kang stations. The concept of having rail lines that bring people almost directly to their homes led to the introduction of the Light Rail Transit (LRT) lines connecting with the MRT network. On 6 November 1999, the first LRT trains on the Bukit Panjang LRT went into operation. The Expo and Changi Airport stations were opened on 10 January 2001 and 8 February 2002 respectively.

The very first infill station of the MRT network to be built on an existing line, Dover station opened on 18 October 2001. The second infill station, Canberra station opened on 2 November 2019. The third, as well as the first underground infill station, Hume opened on 28 February 2025.

The North East Line, the first line operated by SBS Transit, opened on 20 June 2003, is one of the first fully automated heavy rail lines in the world. On 15 January 2006, after intense two-and-a-half years lobbying by the public, Buangkok station was opened, followed by Woodleigh station much later on 20 June 2011. The line's extension to Punggol Coast was opened on 10 December 2024. The Boon Lay Extension of the East–West Line, consisting of Pioneer and Joo Koon stations, opened on 28 February 2009.

The Circle Line initially opened in four phases, with Stage 3 on 28 May 2009, Stages 1 and 2 on 17 April 2010, Stages 4 and 5 on 8 October 2011 and the Circle Line Extension on 14 January 2012. Completing the line, Stage 6 opened on 12 July 2026.

The Downtown Line opened its first stage on 22 December 2013 with its official opening made on 21 December 2013 by Prime Minister Lee Hsien Loong. Stage 2 opened on 27 December 2015, after being officially opened on 26 December by Prime Minister Lee. The Tuas West Extension of the East–West Line, consisting of Gul Circle, Tuas Crescent, Tuas West Road, and Tuas Link stations, opened on 18 June 2017. Stage 3, the final stage of the Downtown Line, opened on 21 October 2017 with its official opening made on 20 October 2017 by Coordinating Minister for Infrastructure and Minister for Transport Khaw Boon Wan.

The Thomson–East Coast Line opened its first stage on 31 January 2020. Stage 2 of the Thomson–East Coast Line opened on 28 August 2021, extending the line from Woodlands South to Caldecott. Stage 3 of the Thomson–East Coast Line opened on 13 November 2022, extending the line from Caldecott to Gardens by the Bay. Stage 4 opened on 23 June 2024, extending the line eastwards along the east coast to Bayshore.

== Network and infrastructure ==
Schematic map of the Mass Rapid Transit (MRT), Light Rail Transit (LRT) and future RTS Link network in Singapore as of July 2026. (An official version can be found on the LTA website)

Name and colour	Commencement	Previous extension	Next extension	Terminus	Length	Stations	Depots	Operator	Control centre	Cost
North–South Line	7 November 1987	2 November 2019 (Note: Canberra infill station)	2034 (Note: Brickland infill station)	Jurong East; Marina South Pier	44 km (27 mi)	27	Bishan, Ulu Pandan	SMRT Trains	Kim Chuan Depot	>S$13.68 billion (Note: NSEWL: S$12.0 billion NSEWL asset renewal (excluding CR151 asset cost, including CR151 service support cost): >S$1.68 billion)
East–West Line	12 December 1987	18 June 2017 (Note: Tuas West extension)	—N/a	Pasir Ris; Changi Airport; Tuas Link	56.5 km (35.1 mi)	35	Ulu Pandan, Tuas, East Coast	SMRT Trains	Kim Chuan Depot	>S$13.68 billion
North East Line	20 June 2003	10 December 2024 (Note: North East Line extension)	—N/a	HarbourFront; Punggol Coast	21.6 km (13.4 mi)	17	Sengkang	SBS Transit	Sengkang Depot	S$4.72 billion (Note: NEL: S$4.6 billion NEL asset renewal: S$117 million)
Circle Line	28 May 2009	12 July 2026 (Note: Circle Line Stage 6)	—N/a	Dhoby Ghaut; Prince Edward Road	39.7 km (24.7 mi)	33 (Note: Excluding Bukit Brown MRT station, which is not in operation)	Kim Chuan	SMRT Trains	Kim Chuan Depot	>S$15.61 billion (Note: Stages 1-5: S$10.0 billion Bayfront; cost shared with Downtown Line: S$463 million Marina Bay: S$348.4 million Stage 6: S$4.85 billion)
Downtown Line	22 December 2013	28 February 2025 (Note: Hume infill station)	2026 (Note: DTL3e / TEL5)	Bukit Panjang; Expo	41.9 km (26.0 mi)	35	Tai Seng, Gali Batu, East Coast	SBS Transit	Gali Batu Depot	S$20.7 billion
Thomson–East Coast Line	31 January 2020	23 June 2024 (Note: Thomson–East Coast Line Stage 4)	2026	Woodlands North; Bayshore	43 km (27 mi)	27	Mandai, East Coast	SMRT Trains	Mandai Depot	S$28 billion
Total:					246.6 km (153.2 mi)	164				

=== Line names ===
The lines are named based on their directions and/or locations. The names were envisioned to be user-friendly, as shown in a survey in which 70% of the respondents expressed such a preference. The Land Transport Authority (LTA) had considered other naming methods in June 2007, whether by name, colour or numbers. After the survey, however, the naming scheme was retained and used for subsequent future MRT lines.

=== Facilities and services ===
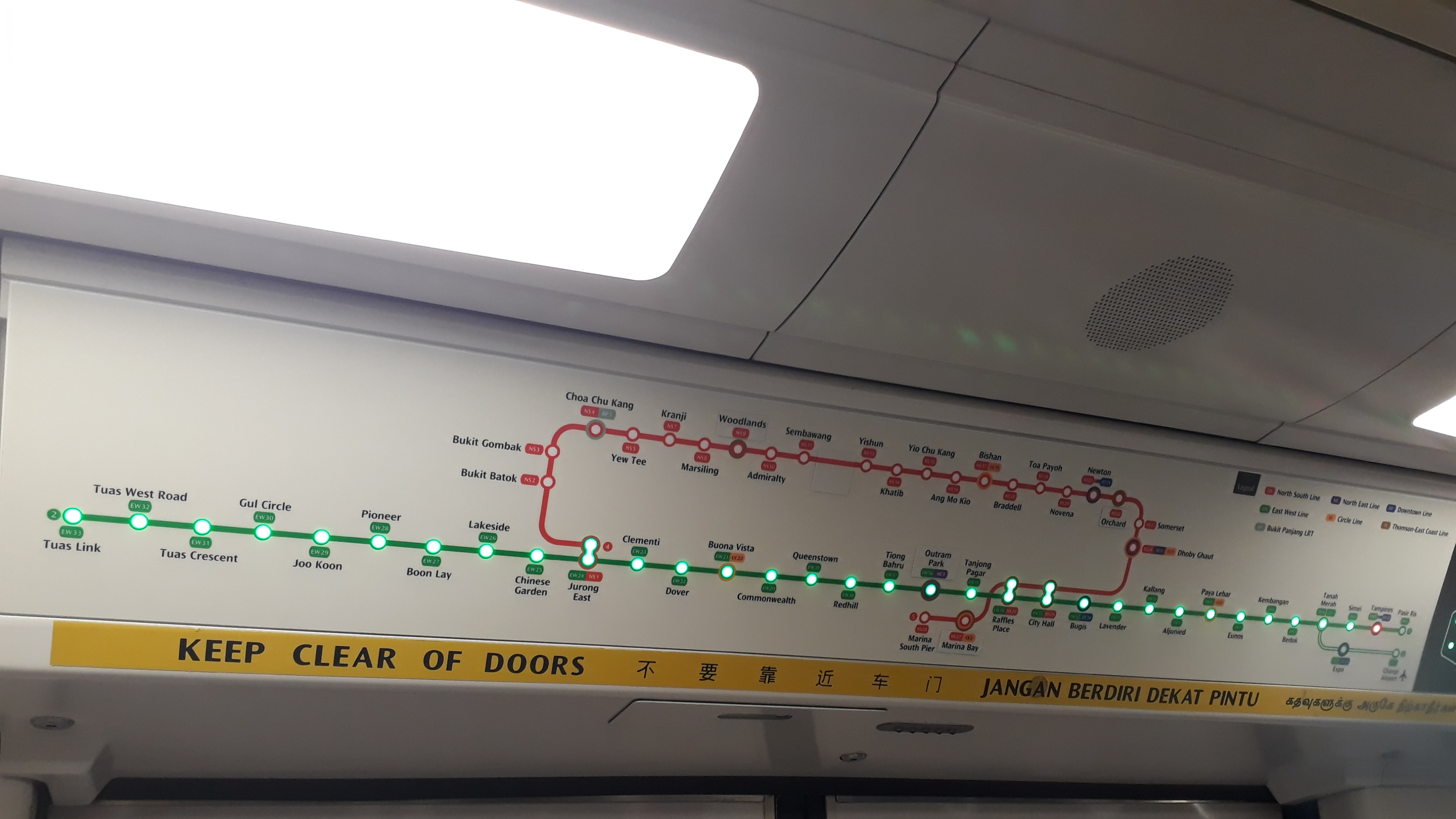
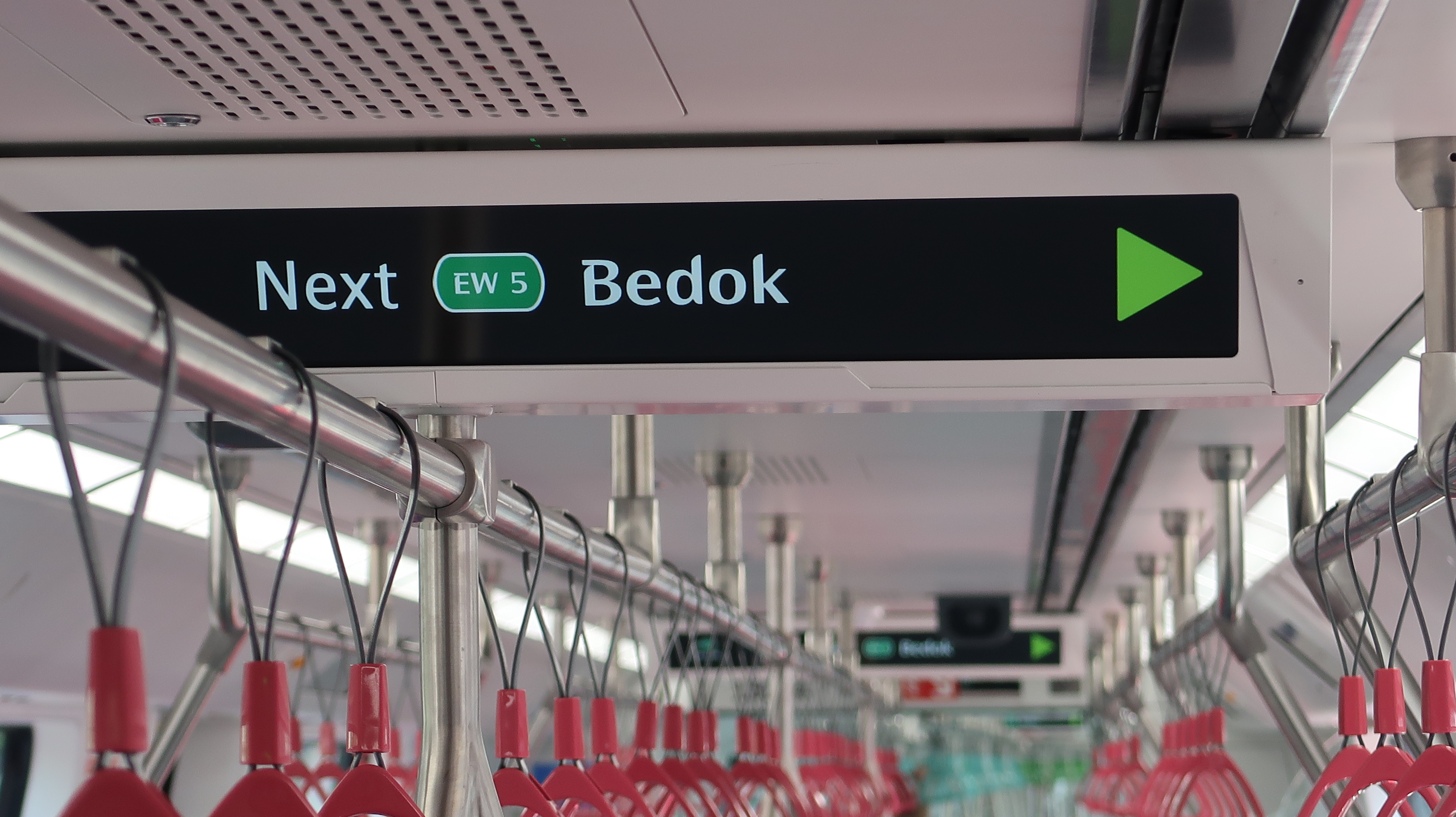
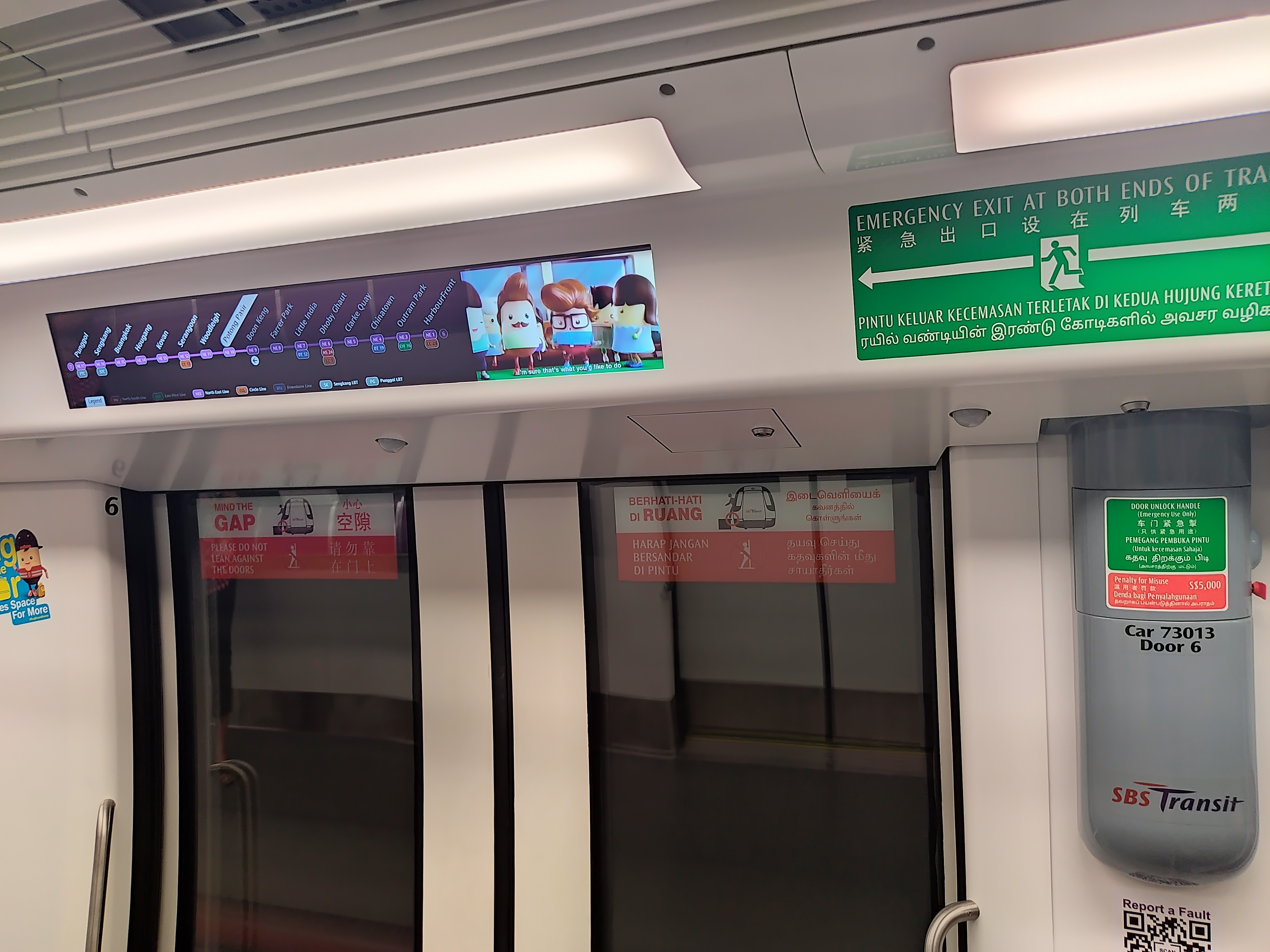
An Active Route Map Information System panel showing the current location of a train and upcoming stops (top), a Ceiling Level Display showing next station information (middle) and a Dynamic Route Map Display (bottom)

Except for the partly at-grade Bishan MRT station (North–South Line), the entirety of the MRT is either elevated or underground. Most below-ground stations are deep and hardened enough to withstand conventional aerial bomb attacks and to serve as bomb shelters. Mobile phone, 3G, 4G and 5G services are available in every part of the network. Underground stations and trains are air-conditioned, while above-ground stations have ceiling fans installed.

Every station is equipped with Top Up Kiosk (TUKs), a Passenger Service Centre and LED or plasma displays that show train service information and announcements. All stations are equipped with restrooms and payphones; some restrooms are located at street level. Some stations, especially the major ones, have additional amenities and services, such as retail shops and kiosks, supermarkets, convenience stores, automatic teller machines, and self-service automated kiosks for a variety of services. Most heavy-duty escalators at stations carry passengers up or down at a rate of 0.75 m/s, which is 50% faster than conventional escalators. The Land Transport Authority (LTA) announced a plan to introduce dual speeds to escalators along the North–South and East–West Lines, to make it safer for senior citizens using them. As a result, all escalators on the two lines, through a refurbishment programme, will be able to operate at a different speed of 0.5 m/s during off-peak hours, with completion being targeted for 2022.

All stations constructed before 2001 initially lacked barrier-free facilities and wider AFC faregates such as lifts, ramps and tactile guidance systems for the elderly and disabled. A retrofitting programme was completed in 2006, with every station provided with at least one barrier-free access route. Over the years, additional barrier-free facilities have been constructed in stations. Since 2020, newer MRT stations have been fitted with a minimum of two lifts.

=== Safety ===
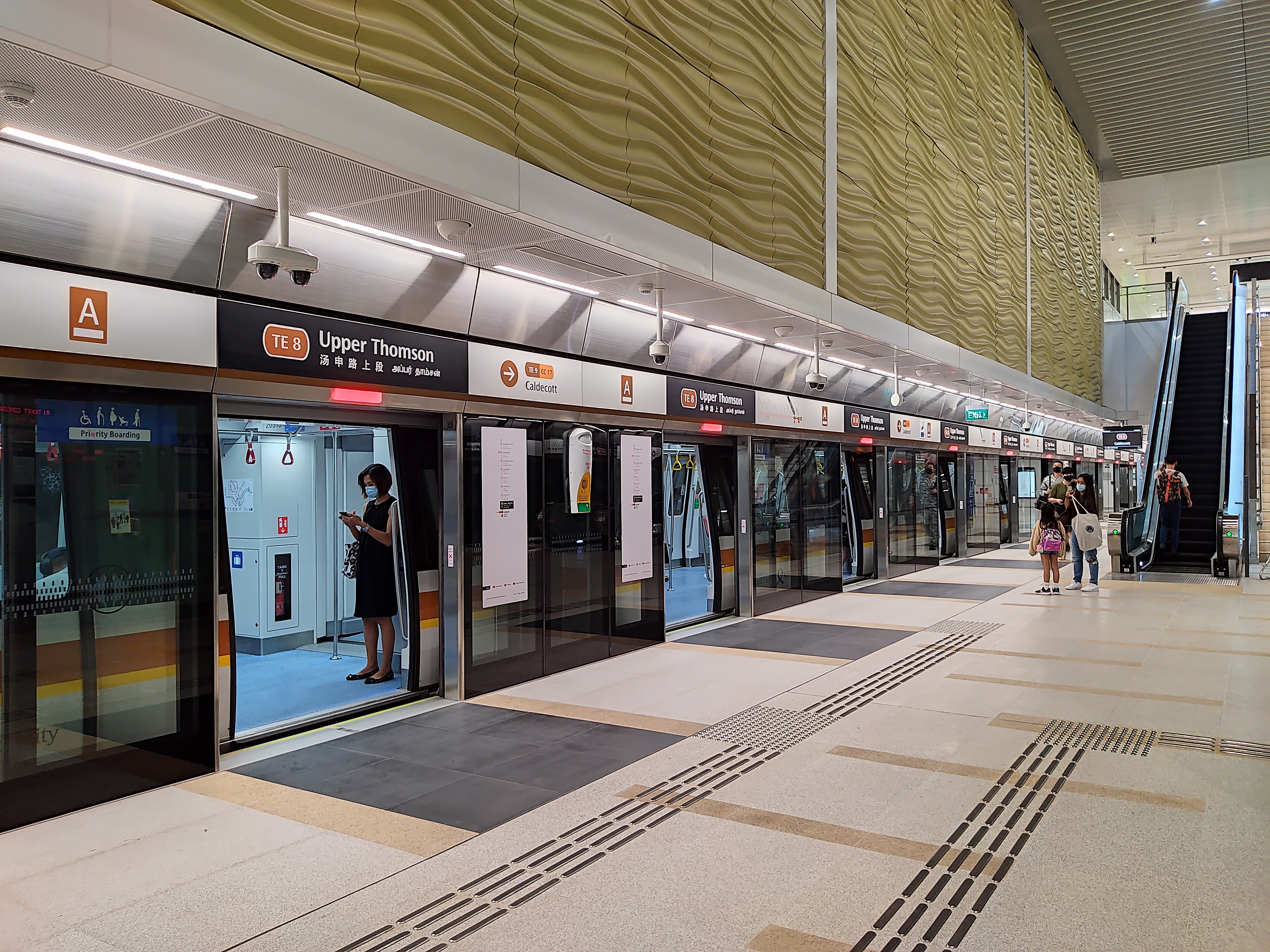
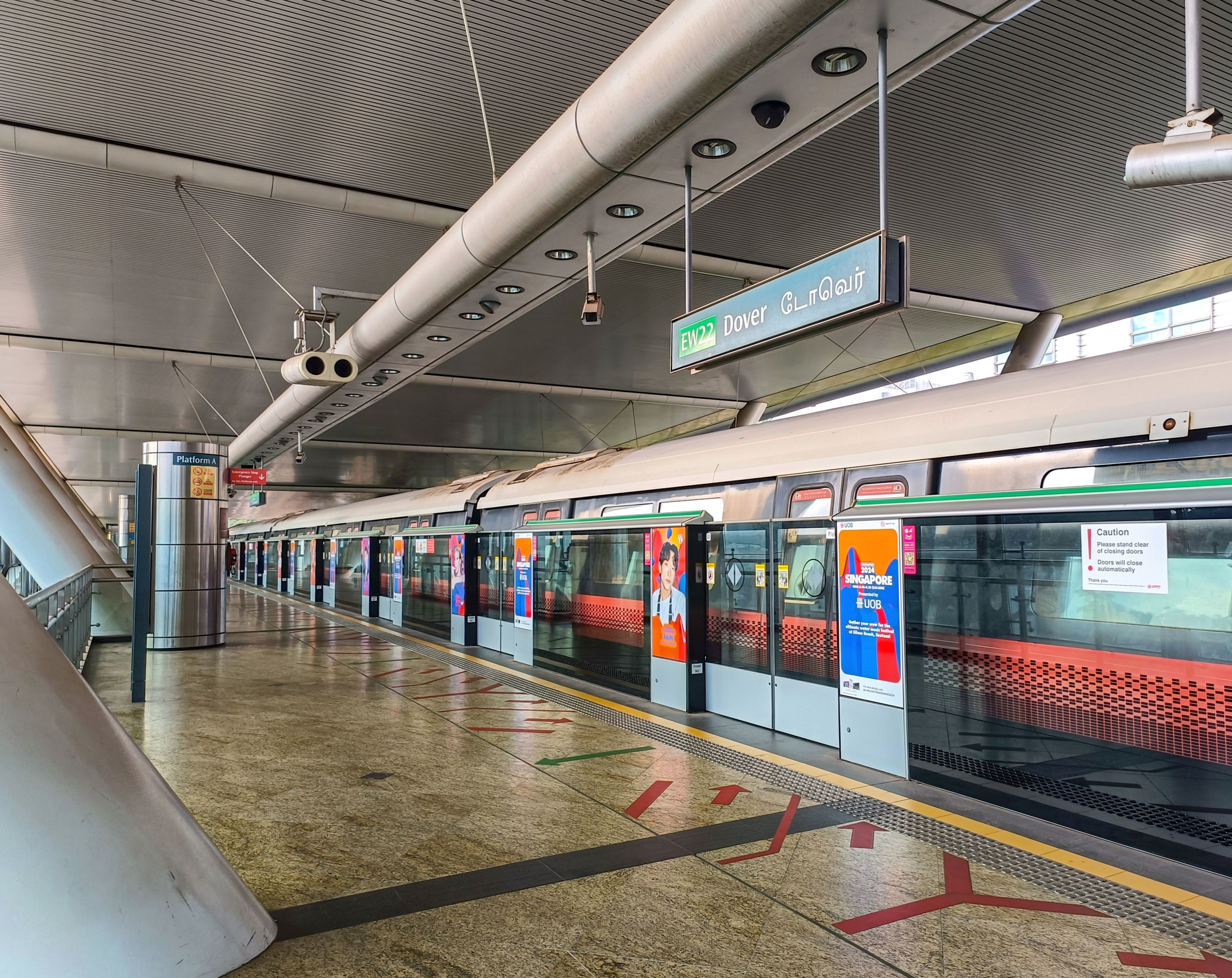
Platform screen doors are installed on all elevated (bottom) and underground (top) MRT stations

Operators and authorities have stated that numerous measures had been taken to ensure the safety of passengers, and SBS Transit publicised the safety precautions on the driverless North East Line before and after its opening. Safety campaign posters are highly visible in trains and stations, and the operators frequently broadcast safety announcements to passengers and to commuters waiting for trains. Fire safety standards are consistent and equivalent with the guidelines of the National Fire Protection Association in the United States.

Full-height platform screen doors were already installed in underground stations since 1987, supplied by Westinghouse. There were calls for platform screen doors to be installed at elevated stations after several incidents in which passengers were killed by oncoming trains when they fell onto the railway tracks at elevated stations. The authorities initially rejected such calls by casting doubts over functionality and concerns about the high installation costs. Nevertheless, the LTA reversed its decision and made plans to install half-height platform screen doors in all elevated stations on 25 January 2008. The first platform screen doors by ST Electronics were installed at Jurong East, Pasir Ris, and Yishun stations in 2009 under trials to test their feasibility.

By 14 March 2012, all elevated stations have been retrofitted with the doors and are operational. These doors prevent suicides and unauthorised access to restricted areas.

There were a few major incidents in the history of the MRT, which opened in 1987. On 5 August 1993, two trains collided at Clementi station because of an oil spillage on the track, which resulted in 132 injuries. During the construction of the Circle Line on 20 April 2004, a tunnel being constructed under Nicoll Highway collapsed and led to the deaths of four workers. On 15 November 2017, two trains, one being empty, collided at low speed at Joo Koon station due to a malfunction with the communications-based train control (CBTC).

Prior to the 2020 "circuit breaker" measures during the early stages of the COVID-19 pandemic, the public transport operators and LTA were criticised by some commuters for its delayed actions of crowd control and the enforcement of social distancing on public transport. In response, the LTA rolled out a series of precautionary measures, such as social distancing measures and making the wearing of masks in public transport mandatory. Social distancing markers were progressively implemented in the MRT trains and stations which commuters must adhere to; enforced by auxiliary officers and transport ambassadors. The significant reduction of commuters as remote work increased resulted in the transport operators reducing train frequencies and closing stations earlier from 17 April. However, train frequencies were shortly reverted to normal upon review and feedback from the public.

Since June 2020, the MRT system has resumed pre-"circuit breaker" operations. Regulations for social distancing on public transport are no longer applicable by law. Social distancing stickers on seats have been removed.

=== Hours of operation ===
MRT lines operate from 5:30 am to about midnight daily, with the exception of selected periods, such as New Year's Eve, Chinese New Year, Deepavali, Hari Raya, Christmas, eves of public holidays and special occasions such as the state funeral of Lee Kuan Yew (2015) and the Singapore Grand Prix, when most of the lines stay open throughout the night or extended till later (before the COVID-19 pandemic began in 2020). Additionally, some stretches of the line end earlier, open later and close on a few days of the weekend. The nightly closures are used for maintenance. During the COVID-19 pandemic across the country, train services ended earlier from 7 April 2020 to 1 June 2020 and service extensions on the eves of public holidays ceased from 7 April 2020 until 28 September 2024 except New Year's Eve. Train service extensions were reinstated back to before the pandemic began in 2020 as mentioned earlier.

=== Architecture and art ===
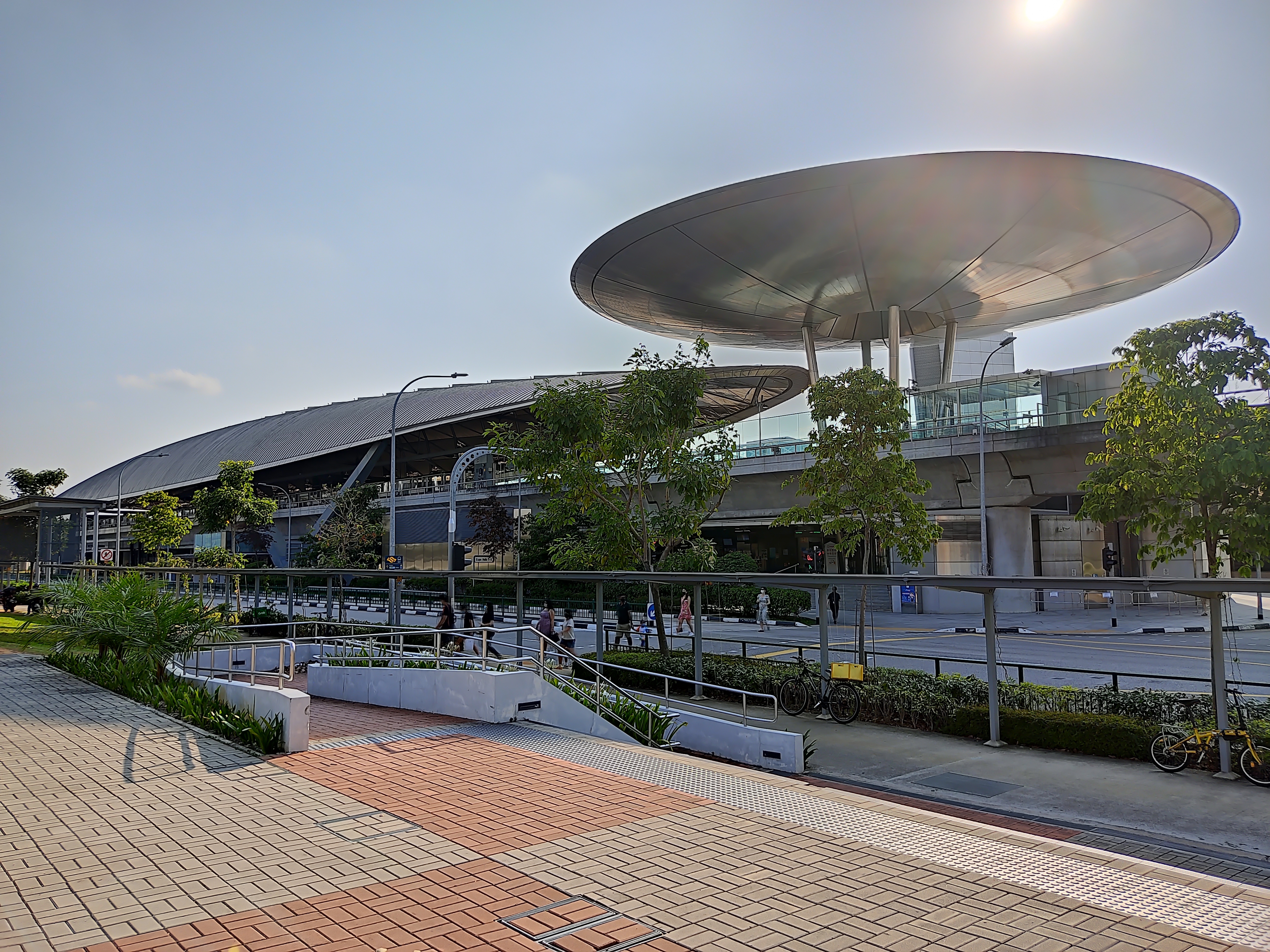
Expo station, situated adjacent to the Singapore Expo exhibition facility, sports a futuristic design by Foster and Partners for its East–West Line platforms.

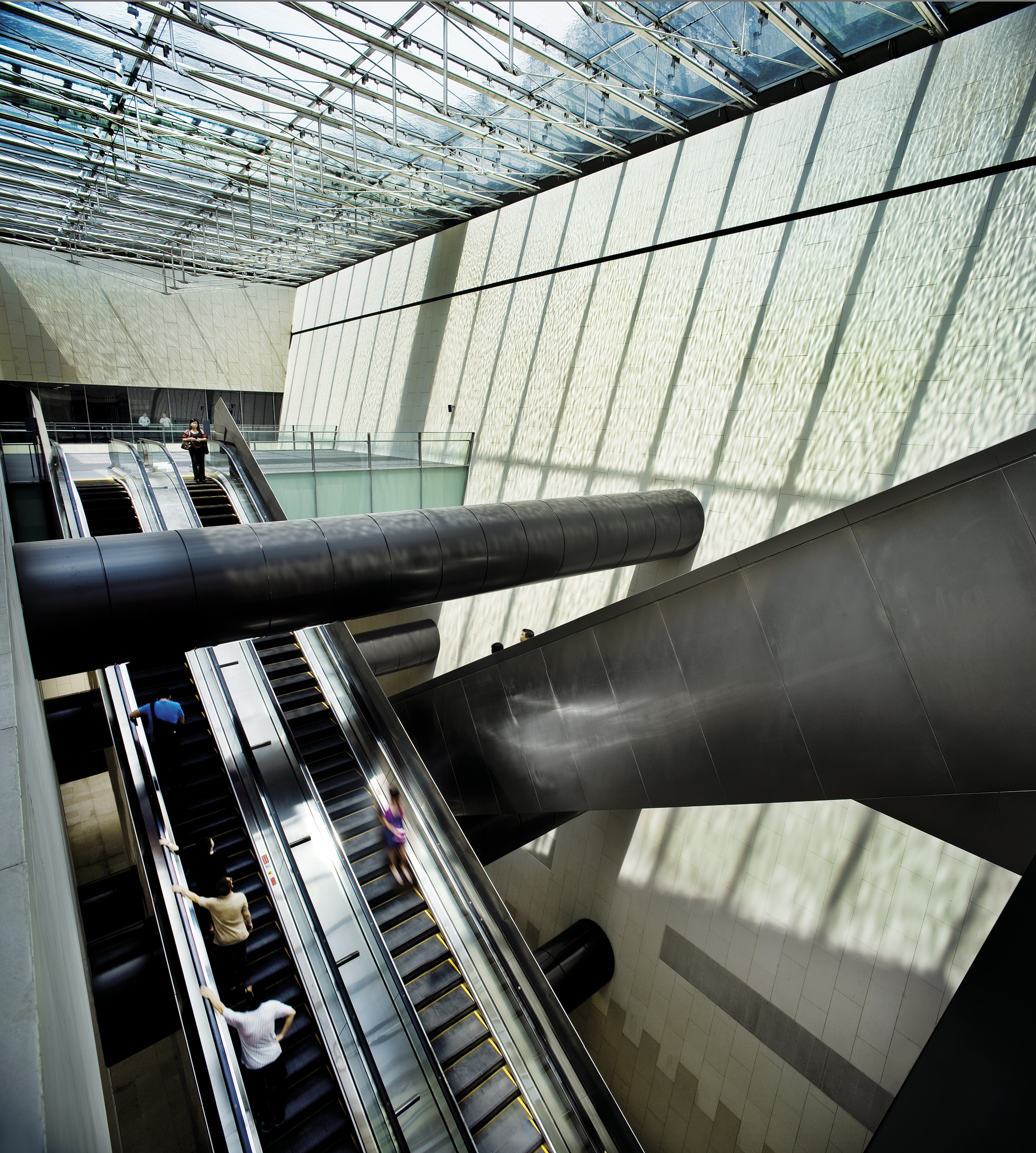
Bras Basah station contains water features that allows sunlight from above to illuminate the station.

Early stages of the MRT's construction paid scant attention to station design, with an emphasis on functionality over aesthetics. This is particularly evident in the first few stages of the North–South and East–West lines that opened between 1987 and 1988 from Yio Chu Kang to Clementi. An exception to this was Orchard, chosen by its designers to be a "showpiece" of the system and built initially with a domed roof. Architectural themes became more important only in subsequent stages, and resulted in such designs as the cylindrical station shapes on all stations between Kallang and Pasir Ris except Eunos, and west of Boon Lay, and the perched roofs at Boon Lay, Lakeside, Chinese Garden, Bukit Batok, Bukit Gombak, Choa Chu Kang, Khatib, Yishun, and Eunos stations.

Expo station, located on the Changi Airport branch of the East–West Line, is adjacent to the 100,000-square-metre Singapore Expo exhibition facility. Designed by Foster and Partners and completed in January 2001, the station features a large, pillarless, titanium-clad roof in an elliptical shape that sheathes the length of the station platform. This complements a smaller 40-metre reflective stainless-steel disc overlapping the titanium ellipse and visually floats over a glass elevator shaft and the main entrance. The other station with similar architecture is Dover.

Changi Airport station, the easternmost station on the MRT network, has the widest platform in any underground MRT station in Singapore. In 2011, it was rated 10 out of 15 most beautiful subway stops in the world by BootsnAll. Various features have been incorporated into the design to make the station aesthetically pleasing to travellers. The station is designed by architectural firm Skidmore, Owings and Merrill, featuring a large interior space and an illuminated 150-metre (490 ft) link bridge spanning over the island platform.

Two Circle Line stations—Bras Basah and Stadium—were commissioned through the Marina Line Architectural Design Competition, which was jointly organised by the Land Transport Authority and the Singapore Institute of Architects. The competition did not require any prior architectural experience from competitors and is acknowledged by the industry as one of the most impartial competitions held in Singapore to date. The winner of both stations was WOHA. In 2009, "Best Transport Building" was awarded to the designers at WOHA Architects at the World Architecture Festival for their design of Bras Basah station.

Many MRT stations have specially commissioned artworks in a wide variety of art styles and mediums, including sculptures, murals and mosaics. With over 300 art pieces across 80 stations, it is Singapore's largest public art programme.

In the early stages of the MRT, artworks were seldom included; primarily consisting of a few paintings or sculptures representing the recent past of Singapore, mounted in major stations. The opening of the Woodlands Extension introduced bolder pieces of artwork, such as a 4,000 kg sculpture in Woodlands. With the opening of the North East Line in 2003, a series of artworks under a programme called "Art in Transit" were commissioned by the Land Transport Authority (LTA). Created by 19 local artists and integrated into the stations' interior architecture, these works aim to promote the appreciation of public art in high-traffic environments. The artwork for each station is designed to suit the station's identity. Subsequently, almost all stations on the North East, Circle, Downtown and Thomson-East Coast Lines, with the exception of Sixth Avenue station, have taken part in this programme during their construction. Additional artworks are also donated and/or installed at stations on other MRT lines.

== Rolling stock and signalling ==
=== Signalling ===
Line	Supplier	Solution	Type	Commission Date	Level of Automation	Remarks
North–South Line	Thales (later Hitachi Rail)	SelTrac Convergence	Moving block; CBTC (Note: Using radio)	2017	DTO (Note: Using coded track circuits)	Brownfield
East–West Line	Thales (later Hitachi Rail)	SelTrac Convergence	Moving block; CBTC	2018	DTO	Brownfield
North East Line	Alstom	Urbalis 300	Moving block; CBTC	2003	UTO	—N/a
Circle Line	Alstom	Urbalis 300	Moving block; CBTC	2009	UTO	—N/a
Downtown Line	Invensys Westinghouse (later Siemens)	Sirius CBTC	Moving block; CBTC	2013	UTO	—N/a
Thomson–East Coast Line	Alstom	Urbalis 400	Moving block; CBTC	2020	UTO	—N/a
Jurong Region Line	Siemens	Sirius CBTC	Moving block; CBTC	2028	UTO	—N/a
Cross Island Line	Siemens	Sirius CBTC	Moving block; CBTC	2030	UTO	—N/a
Former
North–South Line	Westinghouse	FS2000 ATP	Fixed block; speed coded (Note: Using coded track circuits)	1987	STO	Decommissioned on 2 January 2019
East–West Line	Westinghouse	FS2000 ATP	Fixed block; speed coded	1987	STO	Decommissioned on 23 November 2018

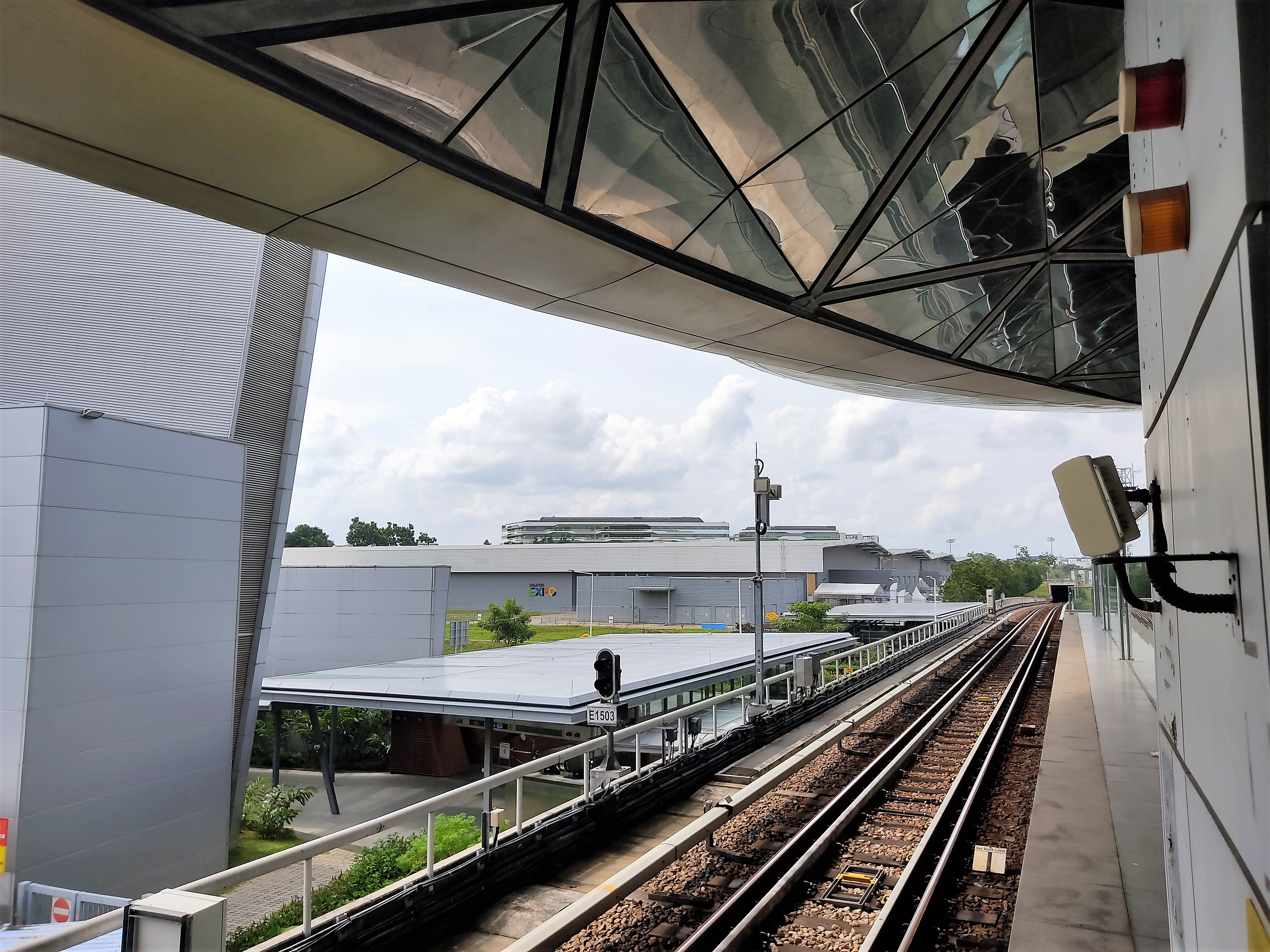
Wayside signal equipment used on the North–South and East–West Lines, which include a two-aspect signal light and an antenna

A key component of the signalling system on the MRT is the automatic train control (ATC) system, which in turn is made up of two sub-systems: the automatic train operation (ATO) and automatic train protection (ATP). The ATC has trackside and trainborne components working together to provide safe train separation by using train detection, localisation, and end of authority protection. It also provides safe train operation and movement by using train speed determination, monitoring, over-speed protection and emergency braking. The safety of alighting and departing passengers will also be provided by using a station interlocking system. The ATO drives the train in automatic mode, providing the traction and braking control demands to the train rolling stock system, adjusts its speed upon approaching the station, and provides the control of opening and closing of train and platform screen doors once the train has stopped at the station. The ATP ensures safe train separation by using the ATP track circuit status and by location determination, monitors the speed of the train to maintain safe braking distance, and initiate emergency braking in the event of overspeed. The MRT also uses an automatic train supervision system to supervise the overall operation of the train service according to a prescribed timetable or train interval.

The oldest lines, the North–South Line and East–West Line, were the only lines running with fixed block signalling. The North–South Line was upgraded to moving block/CBTC in 2017, and the East–West Line upgraded in 2018. As of 27 May 2018, all MRT lines use the CBTC/moving block system in normal daily operations and from 2 January 2019, the old signalling system ceased operations. In comparison to the original fixed block system, the CBTC can reduce train intervals from 120 seconds to 100 seconds, allowing for a 20% increase in capacity and is able to support bidirectional train operations on a single track, enabling trains to be diverted onto another track in the event of a fault on one track. The CBTC system also permits for improved braking performance in wet weather as compared to the original fixed-block ATC.

All new MRT lines built since the North East Line in 2003 were equipped with CBTC from the outset, and have the capability to be completely driverless and automated, requiring no on-board staffing. Operations are monitored remotely from the operations control centre of the respective lines. Trains are equipped with intercoms to allow passengers to communicate with staff during emergencies.

=== Depots ===
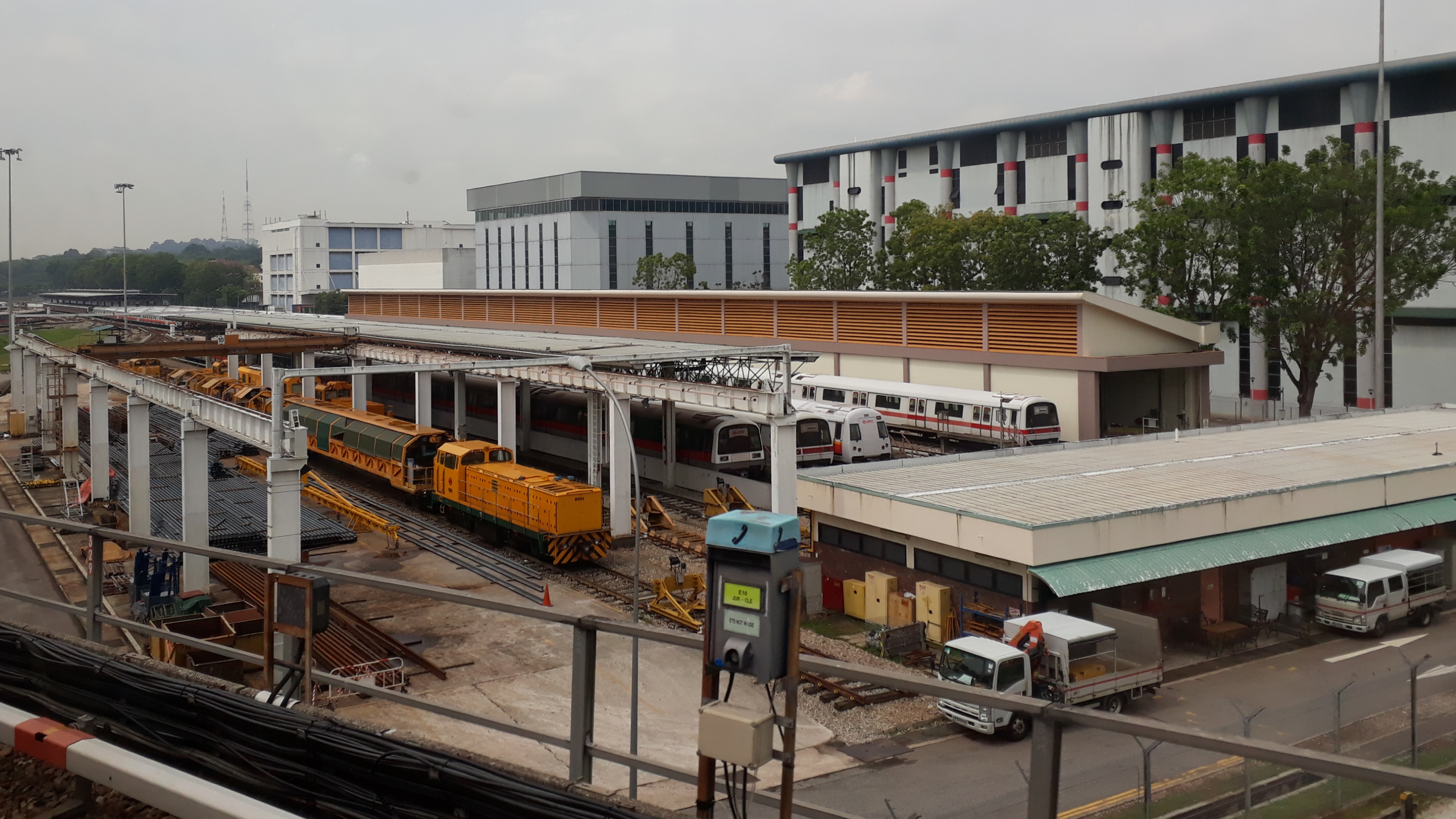
Several MRT trains and a Deli diesel locomotive stabled at Ulu Pandan Depot

SMRT Corporation has six train depots: Bishan Depot is the central maintenance depot for the North–South Line with train overhaul facilities, while Ulu Pandan Depot inspect and house trains overnight. Tuas Depot provides the East–West Line with its own maintenance facility, while Mandai Depot services trains for the Thomson–East Coast Line. The underground Kim Chuan Depot houses trains for the Circle and Downtown Lines, now jointly managed by the two MRT operators. The newest depot, the East Coast Integrated Depot (ECID), currently serves the East–West Line and replaced the nearby Changi Depot. It will also serve the Thomson–East Coast Line in the near future.

SBS Transit has three depots: Sengkang Depot houses trains for the North East Line, the Sengkang LRT line, and the Punggol LRT line. Tai Seng Facility Building, connected to and located east of Kim Chuan Depot, is currently used for the Downtown Line. While major operations were shifted to the main Gali Batu Depot in 2015, the Tai Seng Facility Building resumed stabling operations with the extension of the Downtown Line in 2017. It currently operates independently from Kim Chuan Depot. Gali Batu Depot is the first MRT depot in Singapore to achieve the certification of Building and Construction Authority (BCA) Green Mark Gold. The ECID will soon also serve the Downtown Line.

The Tengah Depot for the Jurong Region Line will be situated at the western perimeter of Tengah, and an additional depot facility will be added near Peng Kang Hill station to support the operations of the JRL. Rolling stock for the Jurong Region Line will be stabled at both facilities. Tengah Depot will house the JRL Operations Control Centre and have a bus depot integrated with it to optimise land use.

The Changi East Depot will serve the future Cross Island Line, and the depot is to be placed at the eastern end of the line.

A Singapore Rail Test Centre (formerly known as Integrated Train Testing Centre) with several test tracks for different situations and workshops for maintenance and refurbishment is also to be built at Tuas by 2022, with the main function being to test trains and integrated systems robustly before they are deployed on operational lines.

== Future expansion ==
=== Infrastructure ===
The following table lists the upcoming lines and stations that have been officially announced:

Line	Stage / Phase	Between		Opening	No. of stations	Length (km)	Depot	Operator
New lines
Thomson–East Coast Line	5	Bedok South	Sungei Bedok	26 December 2026	2	2.5	Mandai, East Coast	SMRT Trains
Jurong Region Line	1	Choa Chu Kang	Boon Lay	Mid 2028	10	24	Tengah	Singapore One Rail
Jurong Region Line	1	Bahar Junction	Tawas	Mid 2028	10	24	Tengah	Singapore One Rail
Jurong Region Line	2	Tengah Plantation	Pandan Reservoir	2028	7	24	Tengah	Singapore One Rail
Jurong Region Line	3	Enterprise	Jurong Pier	2029	4	24	Tengah	Singapore One Rail
Jurong Region Line	3	Nanyang Gateway	Peng Kang Hill	2029	3	24	Tengah	Singapore One Rail
Cross Island Line	1	Aviation Park	Bright Hill	2030	12	29	Changi East	TBA
Cross Island Line	2	Turf City	Jurong Lake District	2032	6	15	Changi East	TBA
Cross Island Line	3	CR20	Gul Circle	Late 2030s	4	10	Changi East	TBA
Extensions / Infills
North–South Line	Infill	Brickland		2034	1	—N/a	Bishan, Ulu Pandan	SMRT Trains
North–South Line	Infill	Sungei Kadut		2035	1	—N/a	Bishan, Ulu Pandan	SMRT Trains
Downtown Line	2e	DE1	Sungei Kadut	2035	2	4	Gali Batu, East Coast	SBS Transit
Downtown Line	3e	Xilin	Sungei Bedok	26 December 2026	2	2.2	Gali Batu, East Coast	SBS Transit
Thomson–East Coast Line	Infill	Founders' Memorial		End 2028	1	—N/a	Mandai, East Coast	SMRT Trains
Thomson–East Coast Line	Unopened	Mount Pleasant		TBA	1	—N/a	Mandai, East Coast	SMRT Trains
Thomson–East Coast Line	Unopened	Marina South		TBA	1	—N/a	Mandai, East Coast	SMRT Trains
Thomson–East Coast Line	Extension	Sungei Bedok	Tanah Merah	Mid 2030s	4	14	Mandai, East Coast	SMRT Trains
Jurong Region Line	Infill	JS2A		Mid 2030s	1	—N/a	Tengah	Singapore One Rail
Jurong Region Line	West Coast; Extension	Pandan Reservoir	West Coast	Late 2030s	TBA		Tengah	Singapore One Rail
Jurong Region Line	West Coast; Extension	West Coast	Kent Ridge	Early 2040s	TBA		Tengah	Singapore One Rail
Cross Island Line	Punggol; Extension	Elias	Punggol	2032	3	7.3	Changi East	TBA
Cross Island Line	Extension	Changi Terminal 5		Mid 2030s	1	5.8	Changi East	TBA

The MRT system relied on its two main lines, the North–South and East–West Lines, for more than a decade until the opening of the North East Line in 2003. While plans for these lines as well as those currently under construction were formulated long before, the Land Transport Authority's publication of a White Paper titled "A World Class Land Transport System" in 1996 galvanised the government's intentions to greatly expand the system. It called for the expansion of the 67 kilometres of track in 1995 to 360 in 2030. It was expected that daily ridership in 2030 would grow to 6.0 million from the 1.4 million passengers at that time.

New lines and extensions are mostly announced as part of the Land Transport Master Plan, which is announced every five years and outlines the government's intentions for the future of the transport network in Singapore. The latest plan, the Land Transport Master Plan 2040, was announced on May 25, 2019, and provides for extensions to the Downtown Line and Thomson–East Coast Line, a new MRT line under study, and 2 new stations on the North–South Line.

=== Downtown Line ===
Map of the Downtown Line

An extension from Expo will commence operation on 26 December 2026, adding an additional 2.2 kilometres (1.4 miles) and 2 stations to the line, terminating at Sungei Bedok and interchanging with the Thomson–East Coast Line. Upon opening, the entire line will be 44 kilometres (27 miles) long and have 37 stations in total.

An extension from Bukit Panjang to the future Sungei Kadut station on the North–South Line, including an unnamed station in between, is planned to commence operation in 2035.

=== Thomson–East Coast Line ===
Map of the Thomson–East Coast Line, including the proposed Changi Airport extension.

Stage 5 from Bedok South to Sungei Bedok will commence operation on 26 December 2026. Founders' Memorial station, an infill station along Stage 4, is scheduled to open in tandem with its namesake development by the end of 2028.

==== Line extension to Changi Airport ====
An extension of the line is under construction to connect it to Changi Airport, with the line passing through Terminal 5, and eventually absorbing the existing Changi Airport branch on the East–West Line. With such an extension, there would be a direct connection between Changi Airport and the city. This extension is expected to start operating by the mid-2030s. Tender for tunnelling works was awarded to Shanghai Tunnel Engineering Corporation, to connect the existing Changi Airport station to the future Changi Terminal 5 station.

=== Jurong Region Line ===
Map of the Jurong Region Line, including the proposed West Coast Extension to Kent Ridge

First proposed as an LRT line when originally announced in 2001, the 20-kilometre (12-mile) Jurong Region Line has since been upgraded to be a medium capacity line after the project was revived in 2013. The new configuration encompasses West Coast, Tengah and Choa Chu Kang and Jurong.

==== JS2A infill station and West Coast extension ====
Announced in March 2026, JS2A station between Choa Chu Kang West and Tengah is planned to be opened in the mid-2030s. The station will serve the upcoming Forest Hill district of Tengah.

An extension of the Jurong Region Line to meet with the Circle Line is currently under study, which if fulfilled, will provide commuters from the West Region an alternative mode of rail transport to the Central Region. Originally proposed to terminate at Haw Par Villa station, the plan was later revised to be linked to Kent Ridge station instead. The extension is planned to be opened in two phases, with the first phase linking Pandan Reservoir station to West Coast station on the Cross Island Line by the late 2030s, and the second phase completing the extension to Kent Ridge station by the early 2040s.

=== Cross Island Line ===
Map of the Cross Island Line

The 50-kilometre (31.1-mile) Cross Island Line is expected to span the entire horizontal axis of mainland Singapore, passing through Tuas, Jurong, Sin Ming, Ang Mo Kio, Hougang, Punggol, Pasir Ris, and Changi. The new line will provide commuters with another alternative for east–west travel to the current East–West Line and Downtown Line. Connected to all the other major lines, it is designed to serve as a key transfer line, complementing the role currently fulfilled by the orbital Circle Line.

Phase 1 of the line was announced in 2019 and consists of 29 kilometres (18.0 miles) and 12 stations, and is planned to be completed in 2030. Vis-a-vis its short rail length from Aviation Park (Changi) to Bright Hill (Bishan), the project costs S$13.3 billion, and is one of the most expensive rail projects globally, to begin construction in 2022. In addition, the extension to Punggol announced in 2020 consists of three stations spanning 7.3 kilometres (4.5 miles), and is planned to be completed by 2032. Completion of the line is expected to take an even longer timeframe due to the environmental study aspects, targeted to be completed by 2030.

Phase 2 was announced in September 2022. Expected to open in 2032, the 15 kilometres (9.3 miles) segment spans six stations from Turf City station to Jurong Lake District station. Construction of Phase 2 officially began in July 2025.

Phase 3 is scheduled to begin construction in 2027, with an expected opening in the late 2030s. It will be 10 kilometres (6.2 miles) long and features four stations, with two stations serving as interchanges to Gul Circle and Jurong Pier stations and the other 2 serving Jurong Industrial Estate and Taman Jurong respectively. The total length of the line would be 67 kilometres (41.6 miles).

=== Brickland and Sungei Kadut MRT stations ===
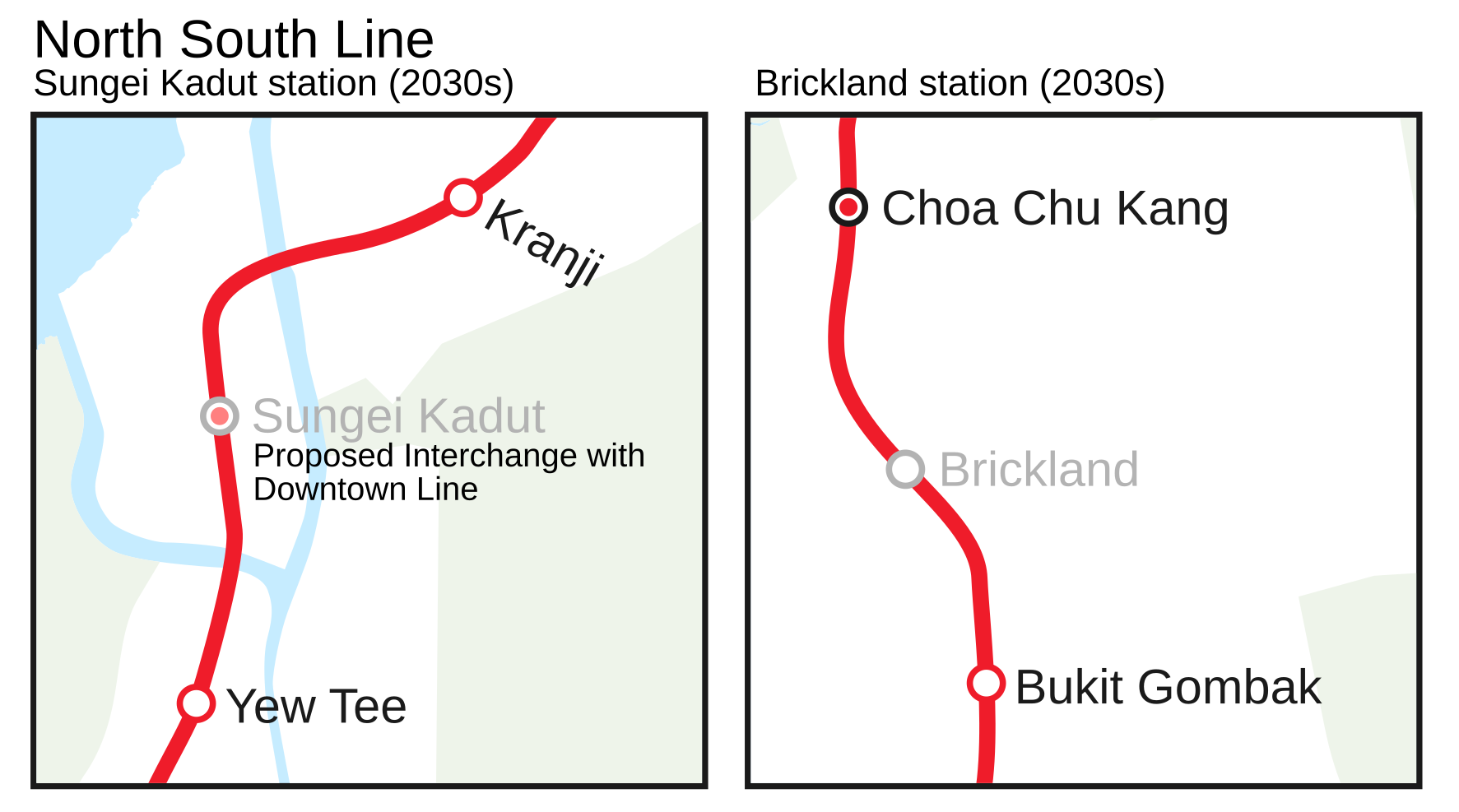
Locator maps of Brickland and Sungei Kadut stations

Two new stations are planned along the existing North–South Line. Brickland station is expected to be built between Bukit Gombak and Choa Chu Kang stations, while Sungei Kadut station is expected to be built between Yew Tee and Kranji stations. The stations are expected to open in 2034 and 2035, respectively.

=== Seletar Line and Tengah Line ===
Since 2019, as part of the Land Transport Master Plan 2040, feasibility studies are ongoing for a possible ninth MRT line to link Singapore's north and northeastern regions to the south of the island, later given the tentative name of Seletar Line. The new line is proposed to serve areas such as Woodlands, Sembawang, Sengkang West, Serangoon North, Whampoa, Kallang, and the Greater Southern Waterfront. By November 2025, feasibility studies for the Seletar Line were still underway. Acting Transport Minister Jeffrey Siow concurrently mentioned that more information on the line will likely be unveiled in early-2026.

In March 2025, Transport Minister Chee Hong Tat announced the tentatively named Tengah Line, which would provide an alternate route from the west and northwestern region to town, serving areas such as Tengah, Bukit Batok, Queensway, and Bukit Merah. Studies are also ongoing to determine the feasibility of extending the line to the Greater Southern Waterfront and connecting with the proposed Seletar Line, in which case both lines may merge into one single line.

Engineering studies for both lines will begin in 2026.

== Fares and ticketing ==
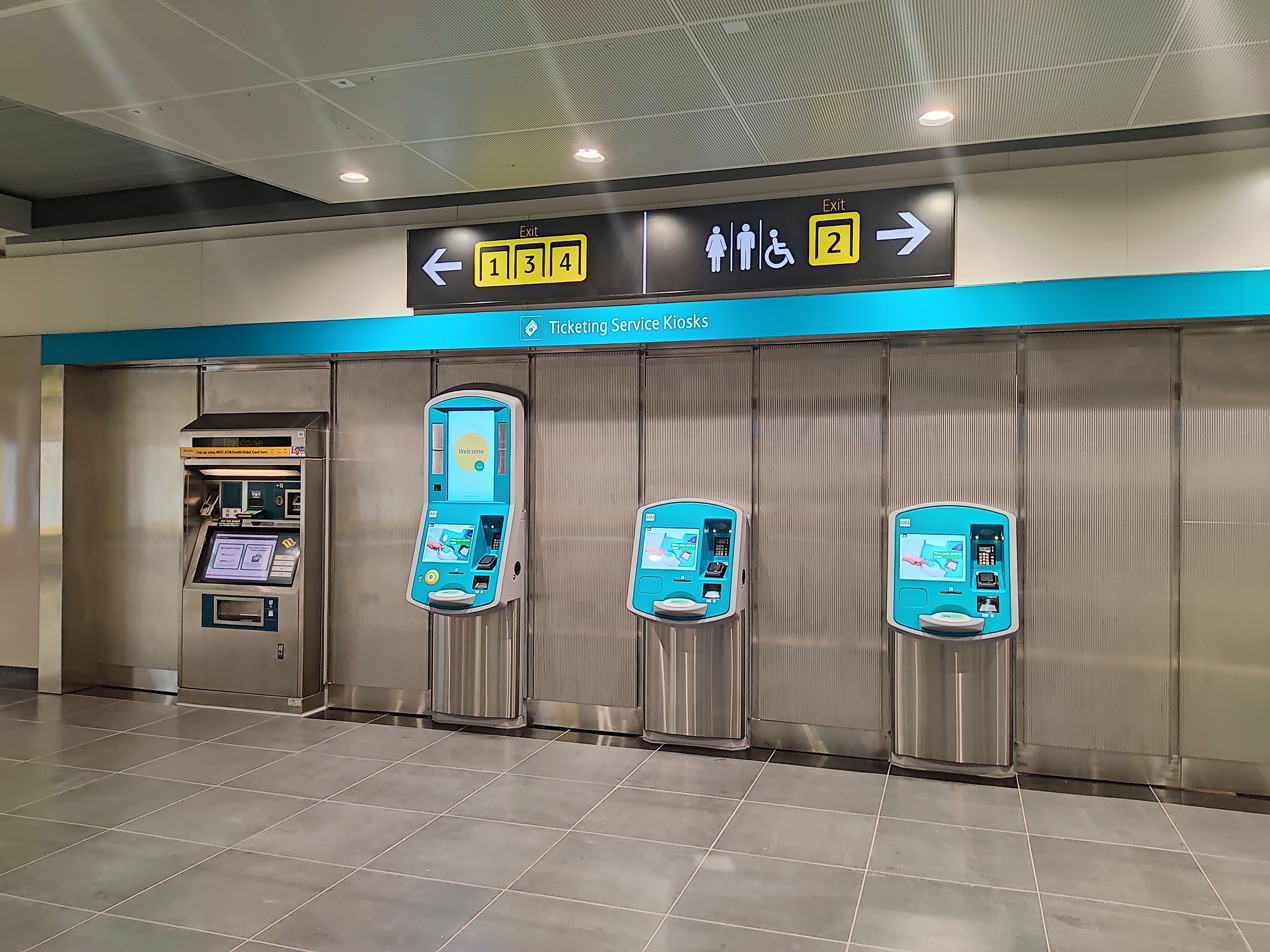
Various types of General Ticketing Machines (GTM) at Bright Hill MRT station, where passengers can purchase a Standard Ticket or add value to their EZ-Link card

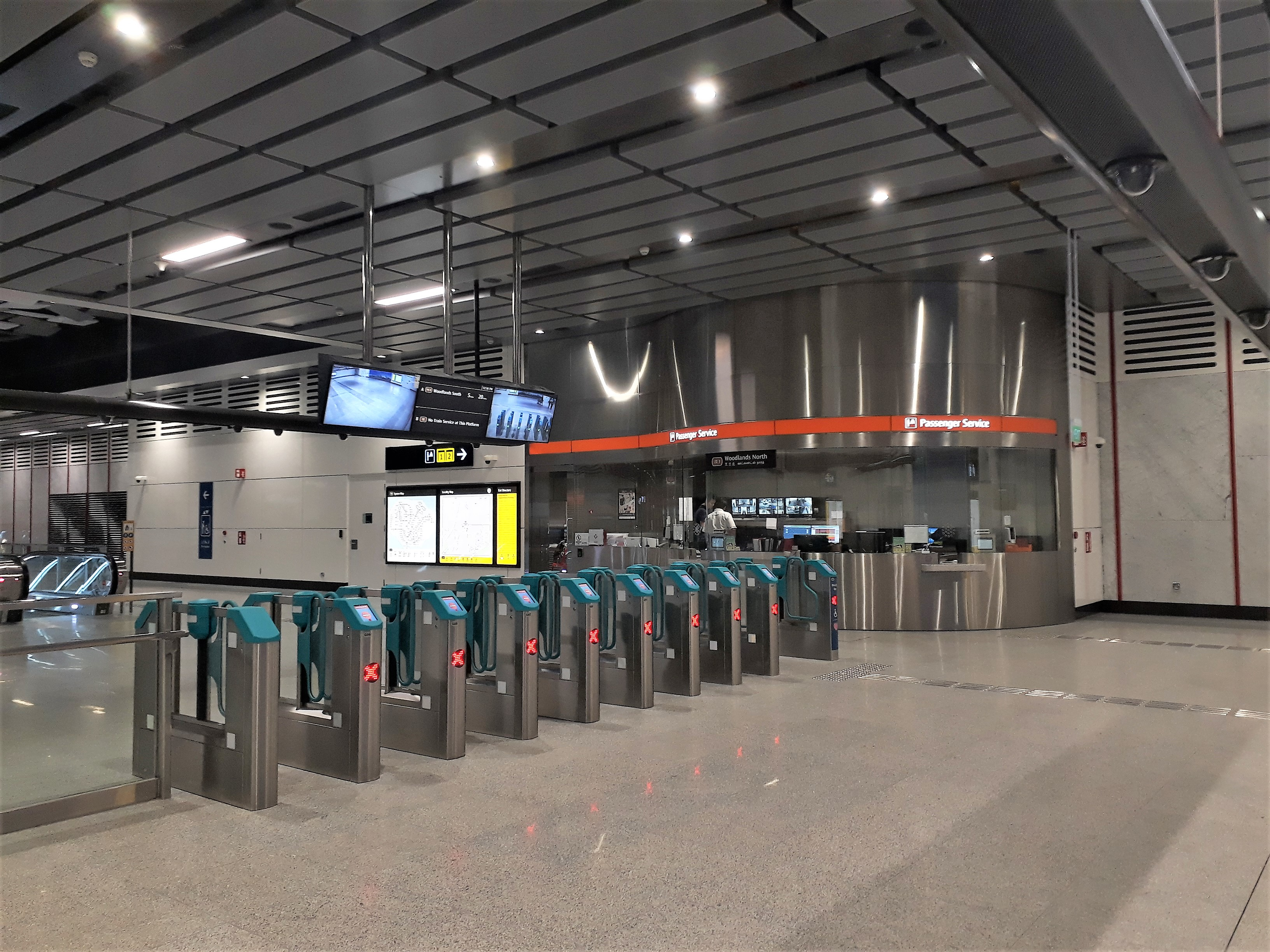
Cubic ticket barriers at Woodlands North station, one type of the many access control gates in the MRT system.

Stations are divided into two areas, paid and unpaid, which allow the rail operators to collect fares by restricting entry only through the fare gates, also known as access control gates. These gates, connected to a computer network, can read and update electronic tickets capable of storing data, and can store information such as the initial and destination stations and the duration for each trip.

The ticketing system currently utilises a mixture of Account-Based Ticketing (ABT), or SimplyGo, and legacy (non-ABT) card-based options. The station machines allow the customer to buy additional value for stored value smartcards. Such smartcards require a minimum amount of stored credit.

As the fare system has been integrated by TransitLink, commuters need to pay only one fare and pass through two fare gates (once on entry, once on exit) for an entire journey for most interchange stations, even when transferring between lines operated by different companies. Commuters can choose to extend a trip mid-journey, and pay the difference when they exit their destination station.

=== Fares ===
Because the rail operators are government-assisted, profit-based corporations, fares on the MRT system are pitched to at least break-even level. The operators collect these fares by selling electronic data-storing tickets, the prices of which are calculated based on the distance between the start and destination stations. These prices increase in fixed stages for standard non-discounted travel. Fares are calculated in increments based on approximate distances between stations, in contrast to the use of fare zones in other subway systems, such as the London Underground.

Although operated by private companies, the system's fare structure is regulated by the Public Transport Council (PTC), to which the operators submit requests for changes in fares. Fares are kept affordable by pegging them approximately to distance-related bus fares, thus encouraging commuters to use the network and reduce heavy reliance on the bus system. Fare increases have caused public concern. Historically, fares on the fully underground North East, Circle, and Downtown lines had been higher than those of the North–South and East–West lines (NSEWL), a disparity that was justified by citing higher costs of operation and maintenance on a completely underground line. However, the Public Transport Council (PTC) announced in 2016 that fares for the three underground lines would be reduced to match those on the NSEWL, which took effect along with the yearly-applied fare changes, on 30 December 2016.

After the opening of Downtown Line Stage 3, Transport Minister Khaw Boon Wan announced that public transport fare rules would be reviewed to allow for transfers across MRT lines at different stations due to the increasing density of the rail network. At the time, commuters were charged a second time when they made such transfers. He added that the PTC would review distance-based fare transfer rules to ensure they continue to facilitate "fast, seamless" public transport journeys. The review of distance-based fare rules on MRT lines was completed, and a waiver on the second boarding fee incurred when making such transfers was announced on 22 March 2018. The scheme was implemented on 29 December of the same year.

=== Ticketing ===
The SimplyGo ABT system accepts bank cards, mobile wallets and proprietary cards issued by EZ-Link and NETS. The legacy card-based system, which utilises the EZ-Link and NETS flashpay cards on the Symphony for e-Payments (SeP), remains usable beyond 1 June 2024, after the government agreed to spend an extra $40 million for their continued use. The EZ-Link and NETS flashpay cards had entered into service in 2009 to replace the FeliCa EZ-Link card. which in turn had replaced the magnetic Transitlink farecard in 2002.

ABT using bank cards and mobile wallets has eliminated the need for top-ups. The stored value cards, which use card-based or cloud-based accounts and are issued by NETS and EZ-Link, may be purchased at the ticketing offices or merchant outlets for immediate use. They can be topped up from the user's primary accounts (such as bank deposits or credit facilities) via their respective mobile applications, or other options under the terms of use. Additional credit of a predetermined value may also be automatically credited into the card when the card value runs low via an automatic recharge service provided by Interbank GIRO or credit card. An Adult Monthly Travel Card for unlimited travel on MRT, LRT, and buses may also be purchased and is non-transferable.

In 2017, TransitLink became the first public transport provider in Southeast Asia to accept contactless bank cards and the use of mobile wallets such as Apple Pay, Google Wallet and Samsung Pay. The system, named SimplyGo, allows commuters to tap their contactless debit or credit cards, or smartphones/smart watches to pay for fares on the MRT, LRT and Bus network. The SimplyGo and NETS Prepaid cards were added to the system and made available to the public since 2021.

The Standard Ticket contactless smart card for single or return journeys, has been phased out completely since March 2022. It was subject to a system of deposits and surcharges: a S$0.10 deposit was levied on top of the fare to be paid. The deposit would be automatically refunded through an offset of the fare to be paid for the third journey on the same ticket while an additional discount of S$0.10 would be given for the sixth journey on the same ticket. No refund of the deposit would be provided if the card was used for fewer than 3 journeys. The ticket could be used for the purchase of single or return journeys to and from pre-selected stations up to a maximum of six journeys over 30 days. Fares for the Standard Ticket were always higher than those charged for the stored-valued CEPAS (EZ-Link and NETS FlashPay) cards for the same distance travelled. The ticket could be retained by the user after each journey and did not need to be returned.

For tourists, a Singapore Tourist Pass contactless smartcard may be purchased for use on the public transport network. The card may be bought at selected TransitLink ticket offices and Singapore Visitors Centres.

== Performance ==
The MRT system did not encounter any major performance issues during its first 25 years of operation. However, between 2011 and 2018, occasional disruptions occurred, often attributed to the system’s ageing infrastructure and the increased ridership driven by population growth.

Beginning with the train disruptions in 2011, this incident led to a committee of inquiry which uncovered serious shortcomings in SMRT's maintenance regime. For the December 2011 disruptions, the Land Transport Authority imposed a maximum penalty of S$2 million on SMRT (approximately US$1.526 million) for the two train disruptions along the North–South Line on 15 and 17 December 2011. A Committee of Inquiry discovered shortcomings in the maintenance regime and checks, prompting CEO Saw Phaik Hwa to resign.

A much larger power-related incident than the December 2011 event occurred on 7 July 2015, when train services on both the North–South and East–West Lines were shut down in both directions following a major power trip. The disruption lasted for more than 3 hours, affecting 413,000 commuters. This was considered the worst disruption to the MRT network since it first began operations in 1987 – surpassing the December 2011 event. Independent experts from Sweden and Japan were hired to conduct investigation into the cause of the disruption. The cause was identified as damage to a third rail insulator due to a water leak at Tanjong Pagar station. Consequently, a program was implemented to replace insulators liable to similar failure. For the July 2015 disruption, LTA imposed a higher penalty of S$5.4 million on SMRT.

On 22 March 2016, a fatal accident occurred off Pasir Ris station. Two of SMRT's track-maintenance trainee staff were lethally run over by an approaching C151 at a signalling box of the station. They were part of a technical team of 15 staff led by a supervisor and were asked to go down to the tracks to investigate an alarm triggered by a possible signalling equipment fault. The operator said the team had permission to access the tracks, but did not coordinate with a signal unit in the station control to ensure train captains in the area where the team was exercised caution while pulling into Pasir Ris station. This incident resulted in a 2.5-hour service disruption between Tanah Merah and Pasir Ris Stations, affecting at least 10,000 commuters.

On 7 October 2017, a dilapidated float and pump system at Bishan station caused a tunnel flood after heavy torrential rainstorms. It was the worst train disruption since 2011 and was the first ever flooding incident in the history of the MRT. This resulted in criticism on the public transport operators among Singaporeans once again and sparked a huge debate about the "high rankings" that manage the system, with calls being made for the resignation of Transport Minister Khaw Boon Wan. Urban transport expert Park Byung Joon from the Singapore University of Social Sciences added that the negligence displayed by SMRT in this regard was tantamount to a criminal offence, and after an internal investigation, found that the maintenance crew of the Bishan Station's pump system had submitted maintenance records for nearly a year without actually carrying out the works.

On 25 September 2024, a major train disruption on the East-West Line occurred when an eastbound Kawasaki Heavy Industries C151 train derailed near Clementi station. As the train was returning to Ulu Pandan Depot after disembarking its passengers, a defective axle box dropped onto the tracks and dislodged the bogie frame, causing damage to 2.55 km (1.58 mi) of track and trackside equipment. The incident shut down all EWL train services between Boon Lay and Queenstown for 6 days until 1 October.

=== Responses ===
The December 2011 disruptions brought the state of public transportation as a whole to national prominence among Singaporeans, who had previously considered the system to be reliable and robust since its inception in 1987. LTA also noted a marked increase in dissatisfaction with public transport with the release of the 2012 Public Transport Customer Satisfaction Survey, and promised government action to deal with issues relating to system disruptions.

The government reviewed the penalties for train disruptions, and made free travel available for all bus services passing MRT stations affected during any train disruptions. Exits were also made free. Affected commuters are now able to obtain a travel chit that certifies that they were delayed due to a train service disruption; these are also available in electronic form. In addition, to increase satisfaction with public transport, free off-peak morning travel, later changed to a discount, was introduced with further improvements continuing to be discussed.

Since 2018, efforts in both maintenance and renewal are starting to pay off with the MRT system clocking an average of 690,000 km between delays in 2018 – a 3.8 times improvement than in 2017. The North–South Line, which was hit by the tunnel flood in 2017, in particular saw its train-km between delays increase by ten-fold from 89,000 km between delays in 2017 to 894,000 km in 2018. By July 2019, the Mean Kilometres Between Failure (MKBF) for the North–South and East–West Lines had jumped to 700,000 km and 1,400,000 km respectively. The new challenges encountered by the government were now on keeping the funding of such renewals required sustainable in the decades ahead.

== Ridership ==
Year	Daily ridership	Ref.
2025	3.49 mil	
2024	3.41 mil	
2023	3.24 mil	
2022	2.75 mil	
2021	2.10 mil	
2020	2.02 mil	
2019	3.38 mil	
2018	3.30 mil	
2017	3.12 mil	
2016	3.10 mil	
2015	2.88 mil	
2014	2.76 mil	
2013	2.62 mil	

== Security ==
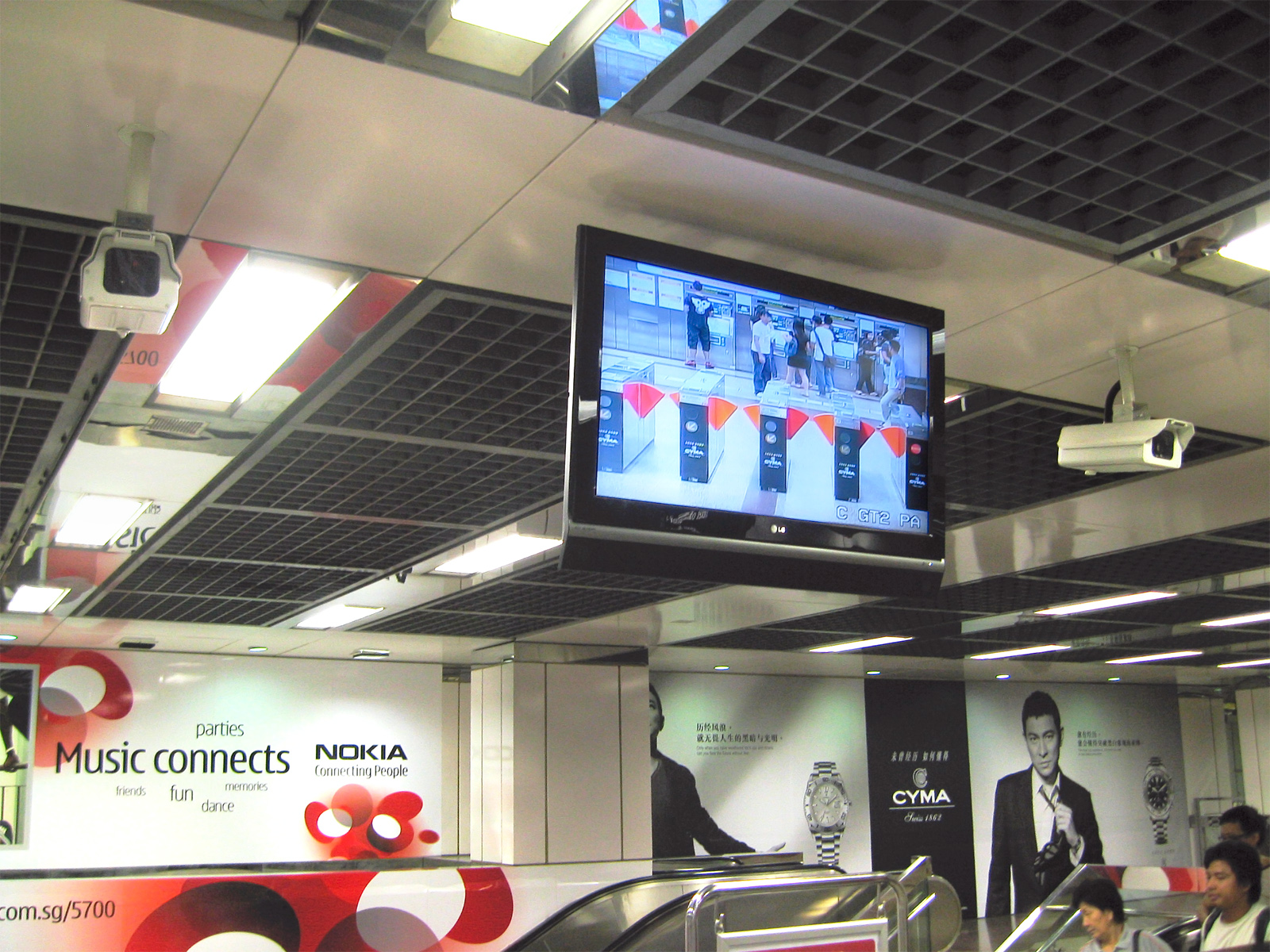
Closed-circuit television cameras monitor activities at City Hall station. A real-time video feed is broadcast and shown at the station concourse.

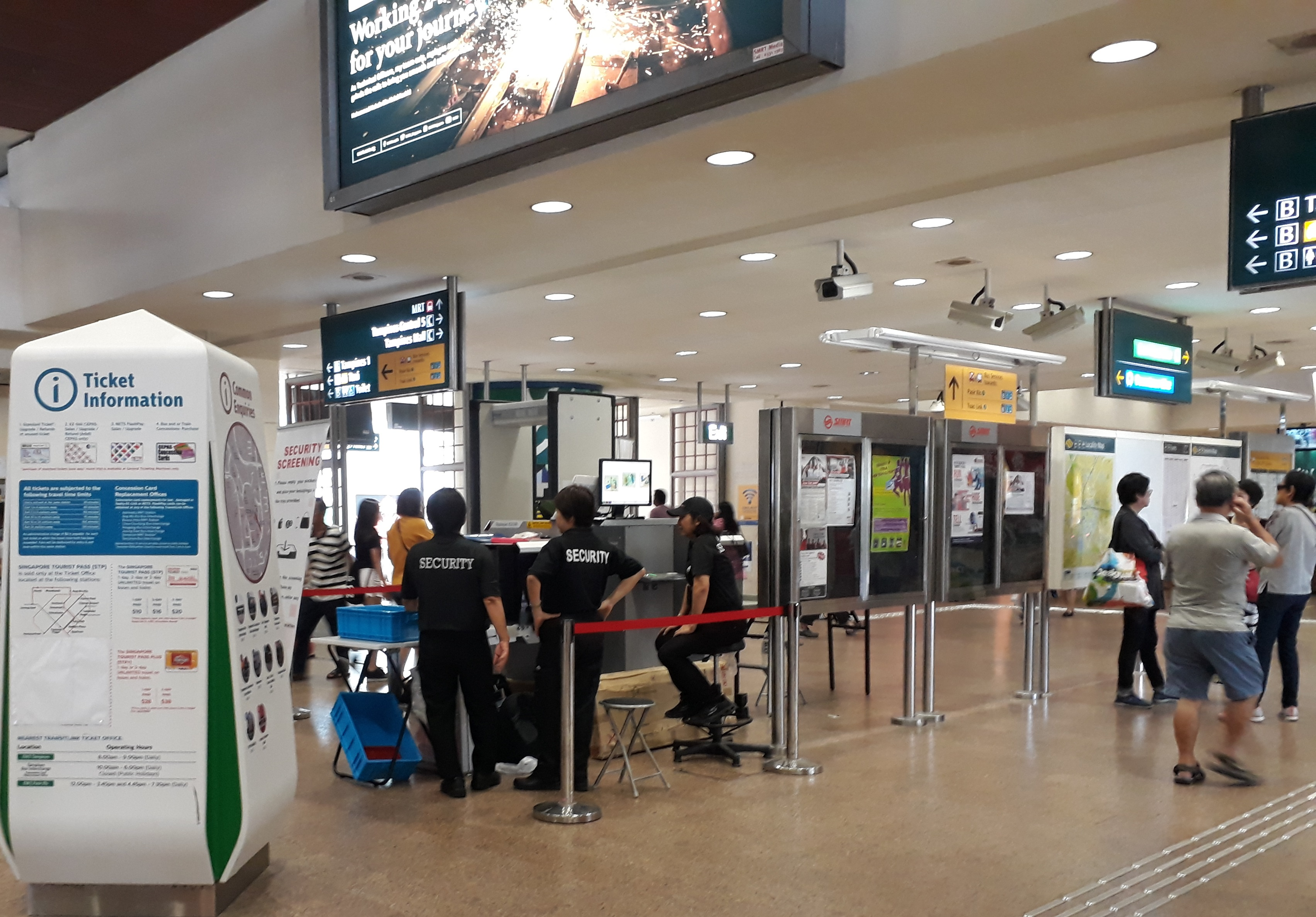
Airport scanners and security seen at Tampines MRT station

Security concerns related to crime and terrorism were not high on the agenda of the system's planners at its inception. After the Madrid train bombings in 2004 and the foiled plot to bomb the Yishun MRT station in 2001, the operators deployed private, unarmed guards to patrol station platforms and conduct checks on the belongings of commuters, especially those carrying bulky items.

Recorded announcements are frequently made to remind passengers to report suspicious activity and not to leave their belongings unattended, and, since 2023, to warn people against voyeurism such as molestation and taking of upskirt photos.

Digital closed-circuit cameras (CCTVs) have been upgraded with recording capability at all stations and trains operated by SMRT Corporation. Trash bins and mail boxes have been removed from station platforms and concourse levels to station entrances, to eliminate the risk of bombs planted in them. While photography and filming is allowed at all of the public areas (except train depots where it is gazetted as restricted areas by law), station staff may conduct checks and interviews to ensure that they are not intended to be used for criminal activities such as taking of upskirt photos. Staff and police may reserve the right to stop these activities.

In 2005, the Singapore Police Force announced plans to step up rail security by establishing a specialised security unit for public transport, then known as the Police MRT unit. The unit today expanded to become Public Transport Security Command (TRANSCOM) since 2009. These armed officers began overt patrols on the MRT and LRT systems on 15 August 2005, conducting random patrols in pairs in and around stations and within trains. They are trained and authorised to use their firearms at their discretion, including deadly force if deemed necessary. The unit over time went on to handle other crimes committed on the MRT network, such as theft and molestation. Recently, on its tenth anniversary in 2019, it has formally evolved to become a hybrid, community-based force, and has launched an initiative to get commuters to aid Transcom officers. Since then, 26,000 people have volunteered, far above the 3000 target.

Civil exercises are regularly conducted to maintain preparedness for contingencies. In January 2006, Exercise Northstar V involved over 2,000 personnel from 22 government agencies responding to simulated bombings and chemical attacks at Dhoby Ghaut, Toa Payoh, Raffles Place and Marina Bay stations. In August 2013, Exercise Greyhound tested the response of SBS Transit's Operations Control Centre and the implementation of its contingency plans for bus bridging, free bus service and deployment of goodwill ambassadors (GAs) during a simulated prolonged train service disruption. About 300 personnel including representatives from LTA, SBST, SMRT, the Singapore Police Force's Transport Command (TransCom), Traffic Police and Singapore Civil Defence Force (SCDF) participated in the exercise.

Security concerns were brought up by the public when two incidents of vandalism at train depots occurred within two years. In both incidents, graffiti on the affected trains was discovered after they entered revenue service. The first incident, on 17 May 2010, involved a breach in the perimeter fence of the former Changi Depot and resulted in the imprisonment and caning of a Swiss citizen, and an Interpol arrest warrant for his accomplice. SMRT Corporation received a S$50,000 fine by the Land Transport Authority for the first security breach. Measures were put in place by the Public Transport Security Committee to enhance depot security in light of the first incident, but works were yet to be completed by SMRT Corporation when the second incident, on 17 August 2011, occurred at Bishan Depot.

== Regulations ==
Under the Rapid Transit Systems Act, acts such as smoking, consumption of any food or drink, including sweets and plain water, in stations and trains, misuse of emergency equipment, unauthorised photography or filming of railway assets and trespassing onto railway tracks or into train depots are illegal, with penalties ranging from fines to imprisonment and possibly caning. Some commentators have suggested that SMRT's strict enforcement of the total ban on the consumption of any food or drink, including sweets and plain water, especially during hot weather or against persons with legitimate needs (such as where consumption of food or drink is needed for medical reasons), is disproportionate and unnecessary.

=== Priority seats ===
There are generally a number of seats in each MRT carriage designated as 'priority seats' located near the train doors which are intended to be used by the elderly, pregnant women, parents with infants and others with mobility problems. The use of such seats by persons who do not fit the foregoing description or who do not outwardly appear to be in need of a seat on the MRT has repeatedly been the subject of public debate in Singapore.

In 2019, the LTA launched the "May I have a seat please?" initiative. Under the initiative, upon request, LTA provides commuters with non-visible health conditions or disabilities or short-term or temporary conditions (such as where they are on medical leave), with a lanyard or sticker respectively reading "May I have a seat please?".

== See also ==
- List of Singapore MRT stations
- Light Rail Transit (Singapore)
- Transport in Singapore
- List of metro systems
- Light metro
- Rail transport in Singapore
