= Market entry strategy =

Method of introducing goods and services

Market entry strategy is a planned distribution and delivery method of goods or services to a new target market. In the import and export of services, it refers to the creation, establishment, and management of contracts in a foreign country.

== Factors affecting viability of entry ==
Many companies can successfully operate in a niche market without ever expanding into new markets. On the other hand, some businesses can only achieve increased sales, brand awareness and business stability if they enter a new market.

Developing a market-entry strategy involves thorough analysis of potential competitors and possible customers. Relevant factors that must be considered when deciding the viability of entry into a particular market include trade barriers, localized knowledge, price localization, competition, and export subsidies.

== Timing of market entry ==
Lymbersky has said that "What countries to enter and when mainly depends on the financial resources of a company, the product life-cycle and the product itself." The different strategies available are: Waterfall model, Wave strategy, and Sprinkler strategy.

== Strategies ==
Some of the most common market entry strategies are: directly by setup of an entity in the market, directly exporting products, indirectly exporting using a reseller, distributor, or sales outsourcing, and producing products in the target market. Others include: Licensing, Greenfield project, Franchising, Business alliance, Turnkey project, Joint ventures, and Outsourcing.

== Market entry and trade risks ==
Some risk is systematic risk which, different from systemic risk, is the risk inherent to the entire market or an entire market segment.

Some of the risks incurred when entering a new market and start domestic or international trade include: weather risk, sovereign risk, foreign exchange risk, liquidity risk, and cultural risk.

While some companies prefer to develop their own their market entry plans, other outsource to specialised companies. The knowledge of the local or target market by those specialized companies can mitigate trade risk.

Other market entry strategies include: production at home, indirect exporting (export merchant), direct exporting (foreign customer, agent, distributor, representative office, foreign branch, foreign subsidiary), production abroad, without direct investment (management contract, franchising, licensing, contract manufacturing), and with direct investment (partly owned subsidiary, acquisition of a foreign company, set up a new company, equity joint venture).

== Sources ==
- Reviving Traditions in Research on International Market Entry, Po Li (Auteur), T. Li, JAI Press, 2003 ISBN 0-7623-1044-8 ISBN 978-0762310449
- On durable goods markets with entry and adverse selection, Janssen, M. Roy, CANADIAN JOURNAL OF ECONOMICS, 2004, VOL 37; NUMBER 3, pages 552-589 ISBN ISSN 0008-4085
