= Sprinkles (disambiguation) =

Sprinkles are decorative candy.

Sprinkles may also refer to:

- Nonpareils, a slightly different decorative candy
- A term sometimes used for light rain
- Sprinkles Cupcakes, a cupcake bakery chain
- Mr. Sprinkles, a character in the 1993 movie Mrs. Doubtfire

== See also ==
- Sprinkle (disambiguation)
