= Sprinkler =

Sprinkler may refer to:

- Irrigation sprinkler, a device for watering lawns or crops
- Fire sprinkler, a device for fire suppression
- Sprinkler (dance), a dance move

== See also ==
- Feynman sprinkler, an experimental device and problem of physics
- Aspergillum, a holy water sprinkler
- Sprinkler strategy, a market entry strategy in business
