= Sprinkle =

Sprinkle may refer to:

- Sprinkles, a decorative candy used on cakes and cupcakes

== People ==
- Aaron Sprinkle (born 1974), American musician and producer
- Annie Sprinkle (born 1954), American actor and educator
- Ed Sprinkle (1923–2014), American football player
- Hugh Sprinkle (1896–1961), American football player
- Jesse Sprinkle (born 1976), American musician
- Jeremy Sprinkle (born 1994), American football player

== Other uses ==
- Sprinkle Spangles, a brand of breakfast cereal
- Aspersion, a method of baptism, particularly used for infants and children
- Baby sprinkle, a small baby shower

== See also ==
- Sprinkler (disambiguation)
