= Wireless engineering =

Wireless Engineering is the branch of engineering which addresses the design, application, and research of wireless communication systems and technologies.

== Overview ==
Wireless engineering is an engineering subject dealing with engineering problems using wireless technology such as radio communications and radar, but it is more general than the conventional radio engineering. It may include using other techniques such as acoustic, infrared, and optical technologies.

== History ==
Wireless technologies have skyrocketed since their late 19th Century advancements. With the invention of the FM radio in 1935, wireless communications have become a concentrated focus of both private and government sectors.

=== In Education ===
Auburn University's Samuel Ginn College of Engineering was the first in the United States to offer a formalized undergraduate degree in such a field. The program was initiated by Samuel Ginn, an Auburn Alumni, in 2001. Auburn University's college of engineering divides their wireless engineering program into two areas of applicable study: electrical engineering (pertaining to circuit design, digital signal processing, antenna design, etc.), and software-oriented wireless engineering (communications networks, mobile platform applications, systems software, etc.)

Macquarie University in Sydney, was the first University to offer Wireless Engineering in Australia. The university works closely with nearby industries in research and teaching development in wireless engineering.

Universiti Teknikal Malaysia Melaka in Malacca, was the first University to offer Wireless Communication Engineering in Malaysia.

== Applications ==
Wireless engineering contains a wide spectrum of application, most notably cellular networks. The recent popularity of cellular networks has created a vast career demand with a large repository. The popularity has also sparked many wireless innovations, such as increased network capacity, 3G, cryptology and network security technologies.
