= Sprinkler strategy =

The sprinkler strategy (also known as sprinkler diffusion strategy) is a market entry strategy based on the principle of diversification in which a company attempts to enter as many markets as possible in a relatively short time.

A successful implementation of the sprinkler strategy requires a high standardization of marketing activities due to the extreme difficulty implied in the simultaneous maximization of marketing activities' customization and of the number of successful market entries. Usually, a certain amount of failed market entries and withdrawals from some markets is accepted if a sprinkler strategy is used. In case a waterfall strategy and a sprinkler strategy are used together, this yields a combined waterfall-sprinkler-strategy.

== Advantages and disadvantages ==
Advantages of the sprinkler strategy are:

- Once a market is successfully entered, its market entry barriers work against potential followers (first-mover advantages).
- The risk associated with multiple simultaneous market entry attempts is distributed regionally (risk diversification).
- Entering multiple markets simultaneously is likely to result in a high volume of sales which is beneficial with respect to capacity utilization.
- By achieving market entry in multiple markets the company makes full use of its competitive advantage.
- Multiple simultaneous market entries in foreign markets allow for a more rapid development of international markets.

Disadvantages of the sprinkler strategy are:

- A successful implementation of the sprinkler strategy incurs a high need for many financial and personnel resources in a very short time frame.
- If too many market entries are unsuccessful and the strategy fails, major losses to the company are highly probable.
- There is less or no opportunity to learn from earlier market entries and apply the lessons learned when making later market entries.

== Sources ==
- Kuester, Sabine (2012): MKT 401: Strategic Marketing & Marketing in Specific Industry Contexts, University of Mannheim.
