= Brownfield (software development) =

New and legacy software co-existence

Brownfield development is a term commonly used in the information technology industry to describe problem spaces needing the development and deployment of new software systems in the immediate presence of existing (legacy) software applications/systems. The term was introduced in 2008 by Hopkins and Jenkins. This implies that any new software architecture must take into account and coexist with live software already in situ.

In contemporary civil engineering, brownfield land means a property, the expansion, redevelopment, or reuse of which may be complicated by the presence or potential presence of a hazardous substance, pollutant, or contaminant.

Brownfield development adds a number of improvements to conventional software engineering practices. These traditionally assume a "clean sheet of paper", tabula rasa or "greenfield land" target environment throughout the design and implementation phases of software development. Brownfield extends such traditions by insisting that the context (local landscape) of the system being created be factored into any development exercise. This requires a detailed knowledge of the systems, services and data in the immediate vicinity of the solution under construction.

== Addressing environmental complexity ==
Reliably re-engineering existing business and IT environments into modern competitive, integrated architectures is non-trivial. The complexity of business and IT environments has been accumulating almost unchecked for forty years making changes ever more expensive. This can be attributed to several factors:

- Environmental complexity is often expressed in legacy code. Legacy skills shortages are driving up maintenance and integration costs.
- Existing complex environments must be re-engineered in phases that make operational sense to their associated business function. These phases often default to wholesale, risky replacements of systems as ignorance of existing complexity means that potential incremental changes are too difficult to understand and engineer.
- Accelerated development methods have left enterprises with modern legacy systems. Complex Java and .NET applications have many of the same problems as older COBOL applications.

As a result, an increasing proportion of the effort of developing new business capabilities is spent on understanding and integrating with the existing complex system and business landscape rather than delivering value.

Brownfield takes the standard OMG model/pattern-driven approach and turns it on its head. Rather than taking the conventional approach of starting with a Conceptual model and driving down to Platform Specific Models and code generation, Brownfield starts by harvesting code and other existing artifacts and uses patterns to formally abstract upwards towards the Architecture and Business tier.

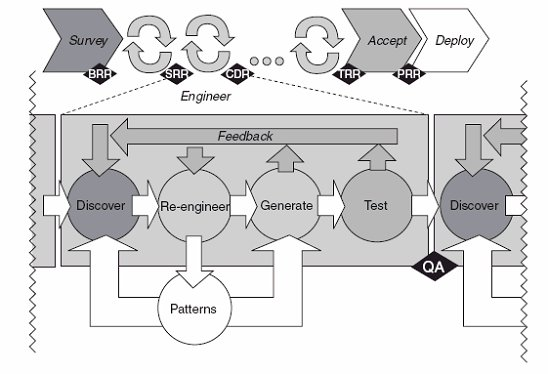
Outline of the Brownfield development process

Standard Greenfield techniques are then used in combination to define the preferred business target. This "meet in the middle" technique is familiar from other development methods, but the extensive use of formal abstraction and the use of patterns for both discovery and generation is novel.

The underlying conceptual architecture of all Brownfield tools is known as VITA. VITA stands for Views, Inventory, Transformation and Artifacts. In a VITA architecture, the problem definition of the target space can be maintained as separate (though related) native "headfulls" of knowledge known as Views. The core advantage of a View is that it can be based on pretty much any formal tool. Brownfield does not impose a single tool or language on a problem space – a core tenet is that the headfulls continue to be maintained in their native forms and tools.

Native Views are then brought together and linked into a single Inventory. The Inventory is then used with a series of Transformation capabilities to produce the Artifacts that the solution needs.

Views can currently be imported from a wide variety of sources including UML, XML sources, DDL, spreadsheets, etc. The Analysis and Renovation Catalyst tool from IBM has taken this capability even further via the use of formal grammars and Abstract Syntax Trees to enable almost any program to be parsed and tokenized into a View for inclusion into the Inventory.

The rapid cyclic nature of the discovery, re-engineer, generate and test cycle used in this approach means that solutions can be refined iteratively in terms of their logical and physical definitions as more of the constraints become known and the solution architecture is refined.

Iterative Brownfield development can allow the gradual refinement of logical and physical architectures and incremental testing for the whole approach, resulting in development acceleration, improved solution quality and cheaper defect removal. Brownfield can also be used to generate solution documentation, ensuring it is always up to date and consistent across different viewpoints.

The Inventory that is created through Brownfield processed may be highly complex, being an interconnected multi-dimensional semantic network. The level of knowledge in the Inventory can be very fine grained, highly detailed and interrelated. Such things are hard to understand and can provide barriers to communication, however. Brownfield solves this problem by abstracting concepts via an artisan's best guess, using known patterns in its Inventories to extract and infer higher level relationships.

Formal abstractions enable the complexity of the Inventory to be translated into simpler, but inherently accurate, representations for easier consumption by those that need to understand the problem space. These abstracted Inventory models can be used to automatically render multi-layered architecture representations in tools such as Second Life.

Such visualizations enable complex information to be shared and experienced by multiple individuals from around the globe in real time. This enhances both understanding and a sense of a single team.

== See also ==
- Design patterns: Strangler, Adaptor, Bridge
- Agile software development
- DevSecOps
- Refactor
- White box (software engineering)
- Business logic
