= Greenfield land =

Agricultural, landscaped, or natural land

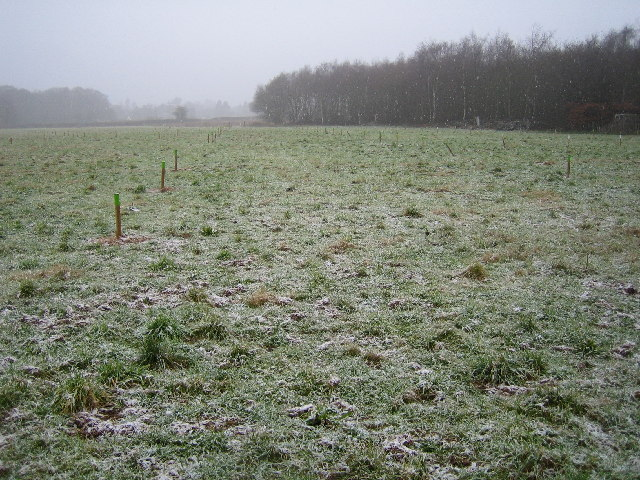
Little Chalfont, Lodge Lane: a greenfield site located in the south east of England.

Greenfield land is a British English term referring to undeveloped land in an urban or rural area either used for agriculture or landscape design, or left to evolve naturally. These areas of land are usually agricultural or amenity properties being considered for urban development.

Greenfield land can be unfenced open fields, urban lots or restricted closed properties. They are kept off limits to the general public by a private or government entity.

Greenfield sites offer a high degree of freedom for a developer, compared to sites with existing developments. For example, a greenfield site is a welcome opportunity for a cable operator to choose equipment based on cost and aesthetic parameters, without considering migration issues related to legacy equipment on the site.

Rather than building upon greenfield land, a developer may choose to redevelop brownfield or greyfield lands, which have been developed but left abandoned or underused.

== Other uses ==
The term has broadened in scope to refer to greenfield projects, which are not constrained by compatibility with prior work but also lack the benefit of existing infrastructure or testing.
