= Greyfield land =

Underused real estate assets or land

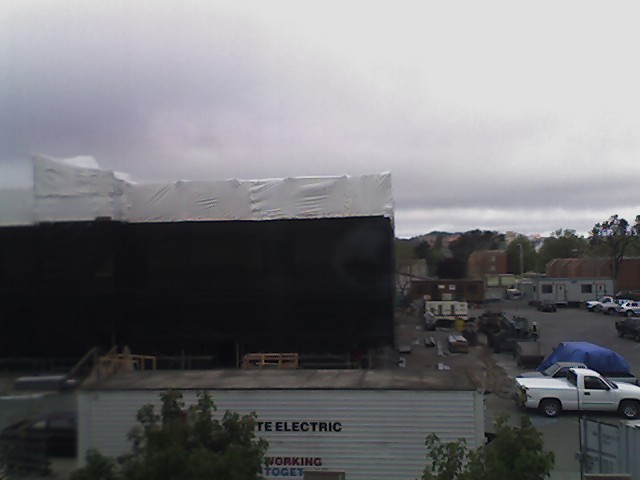
A greyfield in Richmond, California, is used to expand a Kaiser Permanente hospital.

In the United States, greyfield land (or grayfield) is a formerly-viable retail and commercial shopping site (such as regional malls and strip centers) that has suffered from lack of reinvestment and been superseded by other shopping sites elsewhere. These particular greyfield sites are also referred to as "dead malls" or "ghostboxes" if the anchor or other major tenants have vacated the premises leaving behind empty shells. The term was coined in the early 2000s from the "sea" of empty asphalt concrete that often accompanies these sites.

The "greyfield" term may also be applied more broadly to urban infill or commercial locations where underuse or outdated (non-retail) uses hamper an otherwise valuable real estate asset. An example would be a formerly industrial waterfront site that is potentially valuable as a mixed use/residential site as it is being encroached upon by residential sprawl, or other economic or redevelopment pressures. In this example, the revitalization of the greyfield may require zoning changes and/or a public-private partnership of some kind to achieve an increased level of use intensity.

== Background ==
In 2001 the Congress for the New Urbanism coined the term "greyfield," which refers to aging strips of development that once served as vital commercial corridors during the post-World War II suburban exodus but have today fallen on harder times. In contrast to contaminated brownfields and undeveloped greenfields, greyfields refer to "so-called 'dead malls', often characterized by the vast empty asphalt parking lots that surround them."

The most conservative calculations in 1999 estimated that there would be no fewer than 203 American greyfield malls with a combined outstanding debt of over $2 billion and projected redevelopment costs of over $11 billion by 2004. In 2001, of the 2,000 American regional malls, it was estimated that nearly 20% were greyfield malls or in danger of becoming one.

Examples of greyfields in American cities are the Central City Mall in San Bernardino, California; the Prestonwood Town Center in Dallas, Texas; the Maple Hill Pavilion in Kalamazoo, Michigan; and the Lafayette Plaza in Bridgeport, Connecticut.

== Characteristics ==
An average site size is 45 acres (18 ha). These sites are both smaller and less connected to the regional transportation system than those housing America's best-performing malls, which average over 70 acres (28 ha) in size, with freeway visibility and direct ramp access.

Located in established neighborhoods and shopping districts and on suburban arterials with bus service, many are already bus hubs.

They have formidable competition; on average, greyfield malls have 2.3 million square feet (210,000 m^{2}) of competing retail space in 22 other centers within 5 miles (8.0 km). They are often older and smaller than the most successful malls in their region.

Conventional renovations will not be sufficient to breathe new life into many properties. A facelift will do little to help. A new anchor store, depending on the center's position in the market, may not do much either.

== Factors for redevelopment ==
Critical factors necessary for the redevelopment of a greyfield site include the following:

- Market conditions
- Ownership and anchor tenant status
- Site and location factors
- Municipal and community capacity
- Developer and lender capacity

Lessons from successful greyfield transformations are based on the case studies conducted by the Congress for New Urbanism. These sites were the Paseo Colorado development in Pasadena, California; the City Place development in Long Beach, California; the Belmar development in Lakewood, Colorado; the Downtown Park Forest development in Park Forest, Illinois; the Mizner Park development in Boca Raton, Florida; and the Winter Park Village development in Winter Park, Florida. The lessons learned in this study were:

- Incorporate features that will maximize environmental benefits.
- Explore major physical changes.
- Use car parking carefully.
- Incorporate public amenities that add value and distinguish the development.
- Include civic and institutional activities.
- Expect a lengthy pre-development period and prepare for complications.
- Establish a high standard for urban design.
- Market the new concept.
- Develop mixed-uses that can thrive independently.
- Patient money is the best fit for town center projects.
