= List of international schools in Singapore =

The following is a list of international schools in Singapore, which also includes locally-established schools which offer foreign educational programmes.

International schools in Singapore
School	Country	Campus(es)	Level	Examination(s)	Enrollment	Established
Australian International School Singapore (AISS)	Australia	Lorong Chuan	Preschool - Secondary (Grade 12)	IGCSE, HSC, IB Diploma Programme	2,300	1993
Canadian International School (Singapore) (CISS)	Canada International	Jurong West Street 41	Preschool - Secondary (Grade 12)	IB - Primary Years Program (PYP), Middle Years Program (MYP) and Diploma Program (DP)	3,000	1990
Chatsworth International School	Singapore	Bukit Tinggi Road	Preschool - Secondary (Year 13)	IB Primary Years Program (PYP), Middle Years Program (MYP) and Diploma Program (DP)	700	1995
Dover Court International School (DCIS)	United Kingdom	Dover Road	Reception to Year 13	International Primary Curriculum (IPC), English National Curriculum (IGCSEs) and IB Diploma Program (IBDP)	1,650	1972
Dulwich College Singapore	United Kingdom	Bukit Batok West Avenue 8	Toddlers to Year 13	(I)GCSE IB DP	2,250	2014
EtonHouse International School	Singapore	Broadrick Road, Claymore Road, Marina Gardens Drive, Allanbrooke Road, Mountbatten Road, Newton Road, Tanglin Road, Unity Street, Upper Bukit Timah Road, Vanda Road, Bukit Timah Road, Tampines Street 92, Harbour Drive	Preschool - High School	IGCSE, IB	?	1995
French School of Singapore (Lycée Français de Singapour) (LFS)	France	Ang Mo Kio Avenue 3	?	French national curriculum	2,400	1967
German European School Singapore (GESS)	Germany; Singapore	Dairy Farm Lane	Preschool - Secondary	IB (PYP, MYP, DP), Abitur	1,500	1971
Global Indian International School Singapore (GIIS)	India	Cheviot Hill, Punggol Field Walk	?	IGCSE, IB DP, CBSE, IB PYP, Cambridge IGCSE, Global Montessori Plus	?	2002
HWA International School	China	Raffles Boulevard, Slim Barracks Rise	Preschool - High School	IB	?	2006
Hwa Chong International School (HCIS)	Singapore	Bukit Timah Road	?	Elementary School (Year 1 and Year 2), IGCSE (Year3 and Year4), IB Foundation (Grade 10), IB Diploma (Grades 11 and 12), IGCSE and IB Diploma	800	2001
ISS International School	Singapore	Preston Road	Preschool - High School	IB PYP (Grades 1–5) IB MYP (Grades 6–10) IB DP (Grades 11 and 12)	800	1981
Invictus International School	Singapore	Serangoon Road, Loewen Road, Upper Bukit Timah Road	Primary- Grades 1 to 6 Secondary - Grades 1 to 12	International Primary Curriculum (IPC) International Middle Years Curriculum (IMYC) International General Certificate of Secondary Education (IGCSE) Cambridge International A-levels (Advanced Level)	?	2015
Knightsbridge House International School	United Kingdom	Bukit merah	Year 1-year 10	Cambridge Primary Curriculum, Lower Secondary School Curriculum IGCSE Upper Secondary Curriculum	300	2021
Nexus International School Singapore (NISS)	Singapore	Aljunied Walk	Nursery, Kindergarten, Year 1 to Year 13	IB Primary Years Programme (PYP), IGCSE and IB Diploma	?	2011
North London Collegiate School (NLCS)	United Kingdom	Depot Road	?	?	?	2020
SJI International School (SJII)	Singapore	Thomson Road	Primary - Grade 12	IPC (Elementary school) (I)GCSE (Grades 9 and 10) Foundation IB (Grade 10) IB Diploma (Grades 11 and 12)	1,879	2007
Singapore American School (SAS)	United States	Woodlands Street 41	Preschool - Grade 12	Advanced Placement (AP) Program	3,900	1956
Singapore Korean International School (SKIS)	South Korea	Bukit Tinggi Road	Preschool - Grade 12	?	?	1993; 2010 (relocated)
Sir Manasseh Meyer International School (SMMIS)	Singapore	Jalan Ulu Sembawang	Preschool - Grade 10	iGCSE	?	1996; 2016 (current campus)
Stamford American International School	United States	Woodleigh Lane, Chuan Lane	Preschool - Secondary	Dual American and International Baccalaureate curriculum. Primary Years Programme, Middle Years Programme, Diploma Programme (PYP, MYP, IBDP) College Board Advanced Placement (AP) Courses, High School College Preparatory Diploma (ACT, SAT)	2,900	2009
Swiss School in Singapore (SSiS)	Switzerland	Swiss Club Road	Preschool - Primary Grade 6	?	260	1967
Tanglin Trust School (TTS)	United Kingdom	Portsdown Road	Nursery (age 3) – Secondary (age 18)	(I)GCSE (Years 10 and 11) A Levels, IB Diploma (Years 12 and 13)	2,824	1925
The Japanese School Singapore (SJS)	Japan	West Coast Road, Clementi Road, Upper Changi Road North	Primary; Secondary	?	1,700	1912
United World College of South East Asia (UWCSEA)	Singapore	Dover Road, Tampines Street 73	K1 (age 4) - Grade 12 (age 18)	(I)GCSE (Grades 9 and 10); Foundation IB (Grade 10); IB Diploma (Grades 11 and 12)	Dover: 3,000; East: 2,557	Dover: 1971; East: 2008
Waseda Shibuya Senior High School in Singapore	Japan	West Coast Road	Senior high school (10-12)	?	?	1991

== See also ==
- List of international schools
