= List of International Baccalaureate schools in Singapore =

The following is a list of International Baccalaureate World Schools in Singapore.

IB World Schools in Singapore
School	Country	Campus(es)	Level	IB Programme(s)	Established	Remarks	Ref
Westbourne College (Singapore)	Singapore	River Valley	Grade 9 - 12	IGCSE, IBDP	1896	International school exclusively positioned to take in Singaporeans and PRs for the IBDP without prior approval or limits. One of three campuses worldwide, offering the IGCSE and IBDP for 14-19 year old Singaporean, PR, and expatriate students.	
Barker Road Methodist Church Little Lights Preschool	Singapore	Barker Road and Vanda	Preschool	PYP	1967	BRMC Little Lights Preschool (Barker) is the only faith-based preschool in Singapore accredited as an International Baccalaureate Primary Years Programme (IB PYP) World School.	
EtonHouse International School	Singapore	Broadrick Mountbatten 718 Orchard Sentosa Thomson	Preschool - Grade 12	PYP, IGCSE, IB DP	1995	EtonHouse International Educational Group provides an internationally recognised K12 education pathway, offering the International Baccalaureate (IB) Primary Years Programme (PYP), the Cambridge-approved International General Certificate of Secondary Education (IGCSE) qualification in secondary, and the IB Diploma programme in high school. Pre-schools at EtonHouse offers the inquiry focused Inquire.Think.Learn curriculum inspired by the Reggio Emilia approach to education.	
Hillside World Academy (HWA)	China	11 Hillside Drive, Singapore 548926	Preschool-Grade 12	PYP, MYP, DP	2006	A bilingual, multicultural school offering the IB PYP, MYP, and diploma programmes.	
Canadian International School (Singapore) (CISS)	Canada International	Tanjong Katong Campus, East Coast, Singapore (Pre-Kindergarten to Grade 6); Lakeside Campus, West Singapore (Pre-Kindergarten to Grade 12)	Preschool - Secondary (Grade 12)	PYP, MYP, DP	1990	Launched Bilingual Chinese-English programme in August 2014.	
Chatsworth International School	Singapore	Bukit Timah and Orchard	Preschool - High school (Grade 12)	PYP, MYP, DP	1995	K-12 school offering the IB Primary Years, Middle Years and Diploma Programmes.	
GESS - German European School Singapore (GESS)	Germany International	Bukit Timah	Preschool - Secondary	PYP, MYP, DP, German Curriculum	1971	International school following the German and the English IB curriculum with focus on mother tongue programmes for German, Dutch, and Danish.	
School of the Arts, Singapore (SOTA)	Singapore	Dhoby Ghaut, Orchard	Secondary	CP, DP	2008	Diploma Programme (DP) students have to take Higher Level (HL) Arts in either Visual Arts, Theatre, Dance, Film or Music. Literary Arts only at Standard Level (SL) was introduced in 2023. The Career Programme (CP) in Visual Arts, Theatre, Dance and Music is offered as well.	
Stamford American International School	United States	Serangoon (Permanent)	Preschool - Secondary	PYP, MYP, DP	2009 / 2010		
ISS International School (ISS)	International	Orchard and Preston Rd	Preschool - Grade 12	PYP, MYP (Orchard), DP (Preston)			
One World International School (OWIS)	International	Nanyang Campus, Mountbatten Campus	Preschool - Grade 12	PYP, IGCSE, IB DP	2008		
Overseas Family School (OFS)	Singapore	Pasir Ris	Preschool - Grade 12	MYP, DP	1991	Launched in 2015 the school has an intra-curriculum Mother Tongue Programme for 14 languages: French, Spanish, Hebrew, Italian, Russian, Swedish, Korean, Japanese, Chinese, Norwegian, German, Finnish, Dutch & Danish (starting in Kindergarten - following National Programs). SPP (Study Preparation Program - English) - program specifically designed for students whose first language is not English - Chess & Math coding program.	
Australian International School Singapore (AIS)	Australia	1 Lorong Chuan	Preschool - Secondary (Grade 12)	PYP, DP, IGCSE, HSC	1 February 1993	The only international school in Singapore offering the NSW Higher School Certificate (HSC) alongside IB Diploma and Cambridge IGCSE. 99% of graduates enter their first-choice university. In 2025, received Gold in the Curriculum Awards (International Baccalaureate) at the HoneyKids Singapore Education Awards.	
Nexus International School Singapore (NISS)	United Kingdom II (International)	1 Aljunied Walk, Singapore 387293	Nursery, Grades 1 to 12	PYP, DP			
Anglo-Chinese School (International) Singapore (ACS International)	Singapore	Jalan Hitam Manis	Secondary - Pre-tertiary	DP	3 January 2005		
Global Indian International School Singapore (GIIS)	India			PYP, DP			
XCL World Academy (Singapore)	International	2 Yishun Street 42, Singapore 768039	Pre-K to Grade 12 (Age 3 to 18)	PYP, MYP, DP	Founded in 2014	One of the international schools authorised to provides accredited IB programmes in Singapore. It provides international education focusing on a balanced programme across the arts, sports and academics.	
Hwa Chong International School (HCIS)	Singapore	Bukit Timah	Grade 7 to 12	DP	2005	International school following the English curriculum, focusing on small class sizes and extra curricular activities	
Madrasah Aljunied Al-Islamiah	Singapore	30 Victoria Lane, Singapore 198424	Grade 9 to 12	DP	1927	Trilungual Islamic religious school or madrasah (Arabic, English, Malay). Offers IBDP, MOE, as well Al-Azhar curriculum.	
NPS International	India	Scotts Road	Pre-school to Secondary	DP	2007	International School offering IGCSE for Grades 9 and 10, and the IB DP for Grades 11 and 12. Results are very high, with several perfect scorers (45/45) every batch.	
SJI International School (SJII)	Singapore	490 Thomson Road	Primary-Grade 12	DP	January 2007	SJI International comprises an Elementary School (roll 640) and a High School (roll 860) on one campus. IB Diploma results are very high (37.60% of students scored between 40 and 45 points in 2013) and the overall pass rate was 99.30% (world average 80.40%).	
Tanglin Trust School (TTS)	United Kingdom	Portsdown Road	Nursery (age 3) – Secondary (age 18)	DP	1925	British based learning with an international perspective. Offering English National Curriculum, I/GCSE, A Level and IB Diploma	
United World College of South East Asia (UWCSEA)	International	1207 Dover Road; 1, Tampines Street 73	K1 (age 4) - Grade 12 (age 18)	DP	Dover - 1971; East - 2008	School year runs August to June; Member of United World College movement First UWC to be a member of Round Square; Boarding available from Grade 7 to Grade 12; Fully articulated curriculum K1 to Grade 12, leading to (I)GCSE (Grade 10) and IB Diploma (Grade 12)	
Dulwich College	International	71 Bukit Batok West Ave 8, Singapore 658966		DP	2014		

== See also ==
- List of international schools
