= Japanese in Singapore =

Japanese in Singapore may refer to:

- Japanese occupation of Singapore
- Japanese expatriates in Singapore
- Japanese Cemetery Park of Singapore
- Japanese language education in Singapore
