= Karayuki-san =

Trafficked women in the 19th and 20th centuries

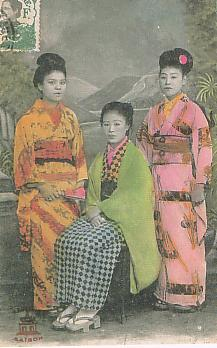
Karayuki-san in Saigon, French Indochina

Karayuki-san (Japanese: 唐行きさん) was the name given to Japanese girls and women in the late 19th and early 20th centuries who were trafficked from poverty-stricken agricultural prefectures in Japan to destinations in East Asia, Southeast Asia, Siberia (Russian Far East), Manchuria, British India, and Australia, to serve as prostitutes.

== History ==
Karayuki-san (唐行きさん; lit. "Ms. Going to China"), signified such women who went abroad to work, usually as prostitutes, courtesans, and geisha, in Asia-Pacific region. They were bound often to European-controlled areas in Southeast Asia or the Pacific, from the late Edo Period into Meiji era (latter half of 19th century into early 20th century) and some years thereafter. During this period, there was a network of Japanese prostitutes being trafficked across Asia, in what was then known as the ’Yellow Slave Traffic.

During the Tokugawa isolationist policies (1639–1853) when passage abroad was generally forbidden, karayuki meant something else, namely, prostitutes who provided call girl services to Chinese men confined to the island Dejima in Nagasaki. Only the Chinese and Dutch (the only trading countries) were allowed to live in Japan at all, and only on the island. The women who served the Dutch were called oranda-yuki. The ladies travelled to the artificial island for a day (later 5 days) at a time, usually despatched from the Maruyama pleasure courters of Nagasaki. A well-known example was Taki who became the common law wife of Philipp Franz von Siebold producing a daughter, Kusumoto Ine.

The later karayuki-san wound up in Hong Kong, Shanghai, and Singapore or British Malaya or the Dutch East Indies, and later Australia (ca. 1896–1916).

Many of the women who went overseas to work as karayuki-san were the daughters of poor farming or fishing families, or were burakumin. The mediators called zegen arranged for the women to go overseas by searching girls of appropriate age in poor farming communities and pay their parents, telling them they were going overseas for a better life. The zegen also resorted to kidnapping, and anecdotes document the rough treatment of the girls they were conveying. The mediators would then make money by passing the girls on to people in the prostitution industry.

Near the end of the Meiji period there were a great number of karayuki-san, and the girls that went on these overseas voyages were known fondly as joshigun (娘子軍), or "female army." However the reality was that many courtesans led sad and lonely lives in exile and often died young from sexual diseases, neglect and despair. With the greater international influence of Japan as it became a Great Power, things began to change, and soon being a karayuki-san was considered shameful. During the 1910s and 1920s, Japanese officials overseas worked hard to eliminate Japanese brothels and maintain Japanese prestige, although not always successfully. Many karayuki-san returned to Japan, but some remained.

After the Pacific War, the topic of karayuki-san was a little known fact of Japan's pre-war underbelly. But in 1972, Tomoko Yamazaki published Sandakan Brothel No. 8 which raised awareness of karayuki-san and encouraged further research and reporting.

They were often sent to Western colonies in Asia, where there was a strong demand from Western military personnel and Chinese men. There were also cases of Japanese women being sent to Siberia, Manchuria, Hawaii, North America (California), and Africa (Zanzibar), while in Karachi and Bombay, there were some Japanese prostitutes to be found.

The role of Japanese prostitutes in the Meiji Era’s imperialist expansionism has been examined in academic studies.

In the Russian Far East, east of Lake Baikal, Japanese prostitutes and merchants made up the majority of the Japanese community in the region after the 1860s. Japanese nationalist groups like the Black Ocean Society (Genyōsha) and Amur River Society-(Kokuryūkai), glorified and applauded the “Amazon army” of Japanese prostitutes in the Russian Far East and Manchuria and enrolled them as members. Japanese prostitutes also performed missions and intelligence gathering operations around Vladivostok and Irkutsk.

The Sino-French War led to French soldiers creating a market for karayuki-san, and eventually prostitutes were the bulk of Indochina's Japanese population by 1908.

In the late 19th century, Japanese girls and women were sold into prostitution and trafficked from Nagasaki and Kumamoto to cities like British Hong Kong, Kuala Lumpur, and Singapore, and then were sent on to other places. In Western Australia, these Japanese prostitutes plied their trade and also entered into other activities, mostly marrying Chinese and Japanese men, while others took Malay, Filipino and European partners.

Japanese girls were easily trafficked abroad since Korean and Chinese ports did not require Japanese citizens to present passports, and the Japanese government realized that money earned by karayuki-san helped the economy through remittances, while the Chinese boycott of Japanese products in 1919 led to reliance on revenue from karayuki-san. Since the Japanese viewed non-Westerners as inferior, the karayuki-san felt humiliated since they mainly sexually serviced Chinese, Korean, and native Southeast Asian men. Those in Sandakan catered to Borneo natives, Malay, French, American, and British men. A Japanese woman named Osaki described how the prostitutes dealt with the men equally regardless of ethnicity (i.e., Japanese, Chinese, Korean, whites, and natives) and yet were of differing temperaments: their "most disgusting customers" were actually the Japanese men; the Chinese and Korean men were "kind enough"; the English and Americans were the second-best clients; and the native men were the best and fastest to have sex with. The nine Japanese managed brothels of Sandakan made up the bulk of brothels there. Two Japanese brothels were located in Kuudatsu, while no Chinese brothels were to be found there. There was also hearsay that a Chinese man had wed the older sister of Yamashita Tatsuno.

During the Philippines’ American colonial period, economic ties with Japan expanded tremendously and by 1929, Japan was the largest trading partner to the Philippines after the United States. Economic investment was accompanied by large-scale immigration of Japanese to the Philippines, mainly merchants, gardeners and prostitutes. Davao in Mindanao had at that time over 20,000 ethnic Japanese residents.

Between ca. 1872 and 1940, large numbers of Japanese prostitutes worked in brothels across the Dutch East Indies.

=== In Australia and Singapore ===
Immigrants coming to northern Australia were Melanesian, Southeast Asian, and Chinese who were almost all men, along with the Japanese, who were the only anomaly in that there group included women. Racist Australians who believed in White supremacy were grateful for and condoned the entry of Japanese prostitutes, since the non-White labourers satisfied their sexual needs with Japanese women instead of White women, avoiding interracial relations. In Australia, the definition of “White” was even narrowed down to people of British descent. Italian and French prostitutes were thus considered "foreign" alongside Japanese women, and were supported in their trade by governments and the police in Western Australia since these women could service "coloured" men instead White Anglo-Saxon women. R. H. Underwood, a politician in Western Australia, celebrated the fact that there were many Italian, Japanese, and French prostitutes in Western Australia in an address to the Legislative Assembly in 1915.

In Western and Eastern Australia, gold mining Chinese men were serviced by Japanese karayuki-san prostitutes. In Northern Australia’s sugarcane, pearling, and mining industries, Japanese prostitutes serviced Kanakas, Malays, and Chinese. These women arrived in Australia or America via Kuala Lumpur and Singapore, where they were instructed in sex work. They originated from Japan's poor farming areas and the Australian colonial officials approved of allowing in Japanese prostitutes in order to sexually service "coloured' men, since they thought that white women would be raped if the Japanese prostitutes weren't available. Port towns experienced benefits to their economies from the presence of Japanese brothels.

Japanese prostitutes were embraced by the officials in Queensland since they were assumed to help stop white women having sex with non-White men. Italian, French, and Japanese prostitutes plied their trade in Western Australia.

At the gold fields, Japanese prostitutes were attacked by anti-Asian White Australians who wanted them to leave, with Raymond Radclyffe in 1896 and Rae Frances reporting on men demanding the women’s expulsion.

Japanese women prostitutes in Australia were the third-most widespread profession. The Queensland Police Commissioner said that they were "a service essential to the economic growth of the north", "made life more palatable for European and Asian men who worked in pearling, mining and pastoral industries" and it was written that "the supply of Japanese women for the Kanaka demand is less revolting and degrading than would be the case were it met by white women".

Between 1890 and 1894, Singapore received 3,222 Japanese women who were trafficked from Japan by Muraoka Iheiji, before being shuttled to Singapore or further destinations. For a few months, the Japanese women would be held in Hong Kong. Even though the Japanese government tried banning Japanese prostitutes from leaving Japan in 1896, the measure failed to stop the trafficking of Japanese women and a ban in Singapore against importing the women also failed. In the 1890s, Australia began receiving immigration Japanese prostitutes, who numbered 200 by 1896. In Darwin, 19 Japanese women were found by the Japanese official H. Sato in 1889. Takada Tokujiro had trafficked five of these women via Hong Kong from Nagasaki, and "had sold one to a Malay barber for £50, two to a Chinese at £40 each, one he had kept as his concubine; the fifth he was working as a prostitute".Sato added the women were living "a shameful life to the disgrace of their countrymen'.

Around areas like ports, mines, and the pastoral industry, numerous European and Chinese men patronized Japanese prostitutes such as Matsuwe Otana. During the late 1880s to the 20th century, Australian brothels were filled with hundreds of Japanese women.

Japanese prostitutes initially showed up in 1887 in Australia and were a major component of the prostitution industry on the colonial frontiers in Australia such as parts of Queensland, northern and western Australia. The British Empire’s and Japanese Empire's growth were both tied in with the karayuki-san. In the late 19th century, Japan's impoverished farming islands provided the girls who became karayuki-san and were shipped to the Pacific and Southeast Asia. The volcanic and mountainous terrain of Kyūshū was bad for agriculture so parents sold their daughters, some of them as young as seven years old to "flesh traders" (zegen) in the prefectures of Nagasaki and Kumamoto. Four-fifths of the girls were involuntarily trafficked while only one-fifth left of their own will.

The voyages the traffickers transported these women on had terrible conditions, with some girls suffocating as they were hidden in parts of the ship or almost starved to death. The girls who lived were then taught how to perform as prostitutes in Hong Kong, Kuala Lumpur, or Singapore, then dispatched to other places including Australia.

A Queensland Legislative Assembly member in 1907 reported that Japanese prostitutes in the small town of Charters Towers lived in bad conditions, while in 1896 in the larger town of Marble Bar in Western Australia, Albert Calvert reported that the conditions in Japanese brothels were good and comfortable.

After the First Sino-Japanese War, a celebration was held at an open-air concert by Japanese prostitutes who performed a dance in Broome in 1895.

The development of the Japanese enclave in Singapore at Middle Road was connected to the establishment of brothels in the 1890s east of the Singapore River, namely along Hylam, Malabar, Malay and Bugis Streets. The karayuki-san dubbed Malay Street as Suteretsu, a transliteration of the English word "street". A Japanese reporter in 1910 described the scene for readers in a Kyūshū newspaper, the Fukuoka Nichinichi:

Around nine o'clock, I went to see the infamous Malay Street. The buildings were constructed in a western style with their facades painted blue. Under the verandah hung red gas lanterns with numbers such as one, two or three, and wicker chairs were arranged beneath the lanterns. Hundreds and hundreds of young Japanese girls were sitting on the chairs calling out to passers-by, chatting and laughing... most of them were wearing yukata of striking colours... Most of them were young girls under 20 years of age. I learned from a maid at the hotel that the majority of these girls came from Shimabara and Amakusa in Kyūshū...

In the Meiji Era, many Japanese girls from poor households were taken to East Asia and Southeast Asia in the second half of the 19th century to work as prostitutes. Many are said to have come from the Amakusa Islands of Kumamoto Prefecture, which had a large and long-stigmatised Japanese Christian community. Referred to as Karayuki-san (Hiragana: からゆきさん, Kanji: 唐行きさん literally "Ms. Gone-overseas"), they were found at the Japanese enclave along Hylam, Malabar, Malay and Bugis Streets until World War II.

The vast majority of Japanese emigrants to Southeast Asia in the early Meiji period were prostitutes (Karayuki-san), who worked in brothels in Malaya, Singapore, Philippines, Dutch East Indies and French Indochina.

Most early Japanese residents of Singapore consisted largely of prostitutes, who would later become known by the collective name of "karayuki-san". The earliest Japanese prostitutes are believed to have arrived 1870 or 1871; by 1889, there were 134 of them. From 1895 to 1918, Japanese authorities turned a blind eye to the emigration of Japanese women to work in brothels in Southeast Asia. According to the Japanese consul in Singapore, almost all of the 450 to 600 Japanese residents of Singapore in 1895 were prostitutes and their pimps, or concubines; fewer than 20 were engaged in "respectable trades". In 1895, there were no Japanese schools or public organisations, and the Japanese consulate maintained only minimal influence over their nationals; brothel owners were the dominating force in the community. Along with victory in the Sino-Japanese War, the Japanese state's increasing assertiveness brought changes to the official status of Japanese nationals overseas as they attained formal legal equality with Europeans. That year, the Japanese community was also given official permission by the government to have their own cemetery on twelve acres of land in Serangoon outside of the urbanised area; in reality, the site had already been a burial ground for Japanese as early as 1888.

Despite these changes in their official status, the community itself remained prostitution-based. Prostitutes were the vanguard of what one pair of scholars describes as the "karayuki-led economic advance into Southeast Asia". It was specifically seen by the authorities as a way to develop a Japanese economic base in the region; profits extracted from the prostitution trade were used to accumulate capital and diversify Japanese economic interests. The prostitutes served as both creditors and customers to other Japanese: they loaned out their earnings to other Japanese residents trying to start businesses, and patronised Japanese tailors, doctors, and grocery stores. By the time of the Russo-Japanese War, the number of Japanese prostitutes in Singapore may have been as large as 700. They were concentrated around Malay Street (now Middle Road). However, with Southeast Asia cut off from European imports due to World War I, Japanese products began making inroads as replacements, triggering the shift towards retail and trade as the economic basis for the Japanese community.

=== In film and literature ===
Japanese film studios shot a number of films in Shōnan (the name of Japanese-occupied Singapore during World War II), depicting the area as a sort of Japanese frontier. Films such as Southern Winds II (続・南の風, 1942, Shochiku Studios), The Tiger of Malaya (マライの虎, 1942, Daiei Studios) or Singapore All-Out Attack (シンガポール総攻撃, 1943, Daiei Studios) presented the area as a land rich in resources, occupied by simple but honest people, and highly exotic. Japanese colonial films also associated the region with sex as many karayuki had been either sold to brothels or chosen to go to there. Karayuki-san (からゆきさん, 1937, Toho Studios), Keisuke Kinoshita's Flowering Port (花咲く港, 1943, Shochiku Studios), and Shohei Imamura's Whoremonger (女衒, 1987, Toei Studios), which were all or partly shot on-location, are examples of the extent to which this sub-genre dominates representations of Malaysia in Japanese cinema.

The 1975 film Karayuki-san, the Making of a Prostitute directed by Shohei Imamura, the 1974 film Sandakan No. 8 directed by Kei Kumai, and Shimabara Lullaby by Kohei Miyazaki also centred on the karayuki experience.

The Memoir of Keiko Karayuki-san in Siam was written about karayuki-san in Thailand. Ah Ku and Karayuki-san: Prostitution in Singapore, 1870–1940 was written about karayuki-san in Singapore. The 2021 award-winning novel, The Punkhawala and the Prostitute by author and filmmaker Wesley Leon Aroozoo and published by Epigram Books, specifically follows the life of Oseki, a karayuki in Singapore. The novel is a Singapore Books Award Winner, Singapore History Prize Nominee and finalist for the Epigram Books Fiction Prize.

Postcards were also made in French Indochina of Japanese prostitutes, and in British Singapore.

Harry La Tourette Foster wrote "in years past, old-timers say, the entire Orient was filled with Japanese prostitutes, until the Japanese had much the same reputation as the French have in foreign cities elsewhere."

The experience of Japanese prostitutes in China was the subject of a book by Tomoko Yamazaki.

During her years as a prostitute, Yamada Waka serviced both Chinese men and Japanese men.

== See also ==
- Slavery in Japan
- Jagatara Oharu - an Italian-Japanese girl banished to Batavia in the 17th century
- Tōjin Okichi - serviced American consul general Townsend Harris in Shimoda
