= NACAC =

NACAC may refer to:

- National Association for College Admission Counseling
- North American, Central American and Caribbean Athletic Association
