= Middle Road, Singapore =

Middle Road
- Road

Name transcription(s)
  - Chinese: 密驼路
  - Japanese: 中央通り
  - Malay: Jalan Tengah
  - Tamil: மிடில் ரோடு
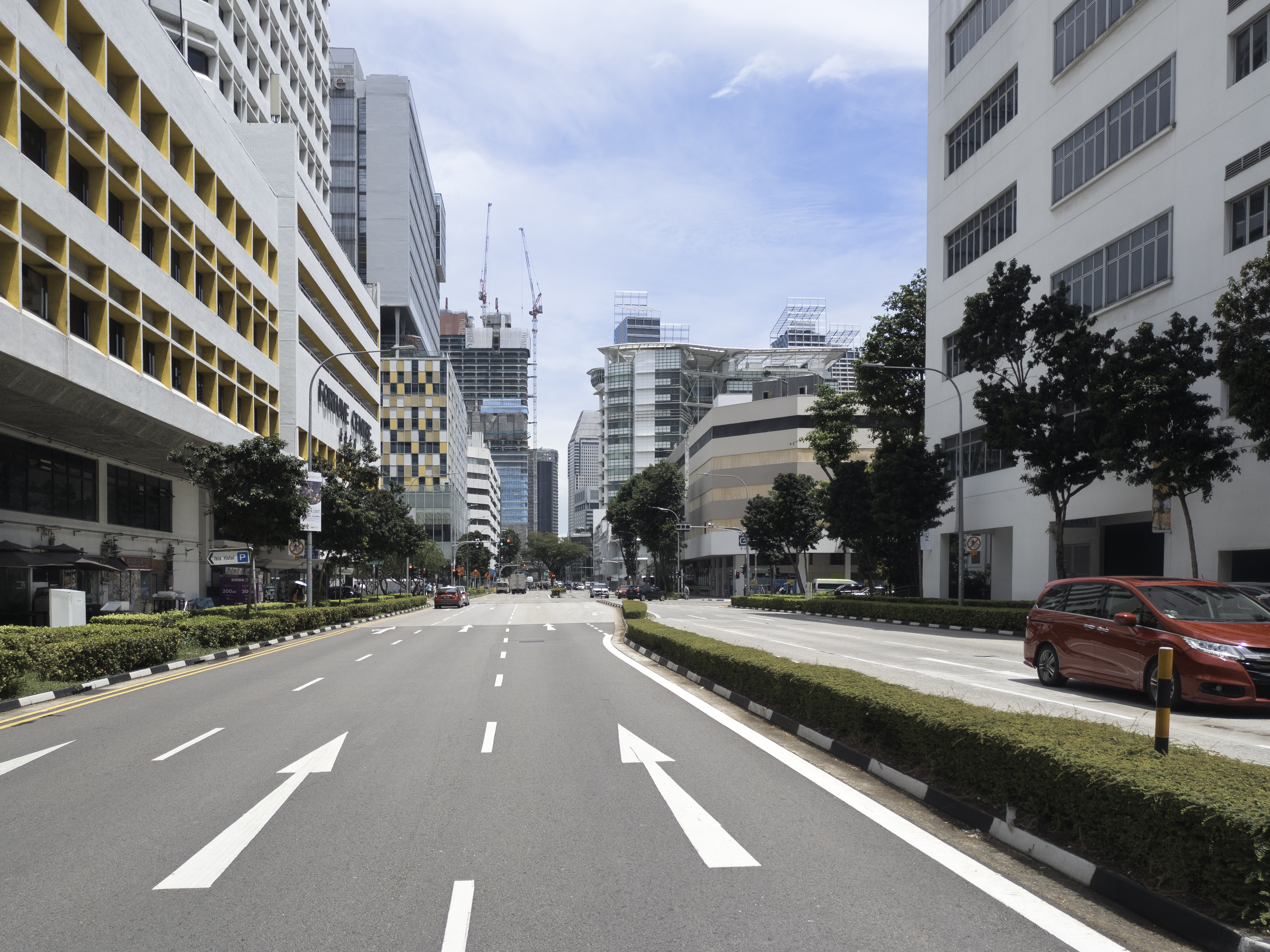
- Middle Road in March 2025
- Interactive map of Middle Road
- Coordinates: 1.2955°N 103.8574°E
- Country: Singapore

Middle Road is a road in the Central Area of Singapore, stretching along the Downtown Core and Rochor planning areas. It starts from its junction with Selegie Road and ends at its junction with Nicoll Highway. Middle Road was already in existence in early Singapore, appearing in George Drumgoole Coleman's Map of Singapore in 1836. The area around Middle Road was the original settlement of the Hainanese immigrant community, a community noted for its active role in the food and beverage history of Singapore. From the late 19th century until the Second World War, the area around Middle Road, Hylam Street and Malay Street was also a bustling Japanese enclave known for its brothels of Karayuki-san and traditional shops run by the Japanese immigrants.

== Etymology ==
The road formerly served as a demarcation line which separated the civic area from the ethnic settlements of Singapore as part of the British colonial government's town planning, known as the Jackson Plan. Jackson's 1822 plan for the European Town composed of four parallel roads laid out in the northeast-southwestern direction, and a major intersecting road. This perpendicular road is the present-day Middle Road. Due to increasing Chinese immigrants settling near the European Town, the Europeans subsequently vacated the area to dwell more inland, away from the urbanising city quarters.

== History ==
=== Hainanese community and enclave ===
Of the Chinese dialect groups that occupied the area of Middle Road, the Hainanese community was the largest. Its enclave was adjacent to European churches, army camps and the Raffles Hotel, and extended from the seashore along Beach Road westwards towards North Bridge Road. The three streets that run perpendicular to these two – Middle Road, Purvis Street and Seah Street were respectively called Hainan First Street, Hainan Second Street and Hainan Third Street by the Hainanese and other Chinese communities.

The first Hainanese settler was recorded as Lim Chong Jin, who arrived in Singapore in 1841. By 1881, the Hainanese had constituted about 10% of the local Chinese population numbering 8,319. The Hainanese worked mainly in service-related industries and operated provision shops, ship-chandling and remittance services, hotels and coffee shops. It was in the "food" business that would bring them most regional fame. Ngiam Tong Boon, a Hainanese bartender working at Raffles Hotel concocted a gin tonic called The Singapore Sling in 1915. At Nos. 51—53 Middle Road (now demolished), Wong Yi Guan adapted a rice dish served with chicken, which made famous by his apprentice Mok Fu Swee through his restaurant, Swee Kee Chicken Rice. Later, this dish would be "re-exported" elsewhere in the region as Hainanese chicken rice. It is generally acknowledged that the Hainanese brewed the best coffee in kopitiams (coffeeshops) of Southeast Asia. Some turned into successful franchise business such as Ya Kun Kaya Toast founded by another Hainanese, Loi Ah Koon in 1944.

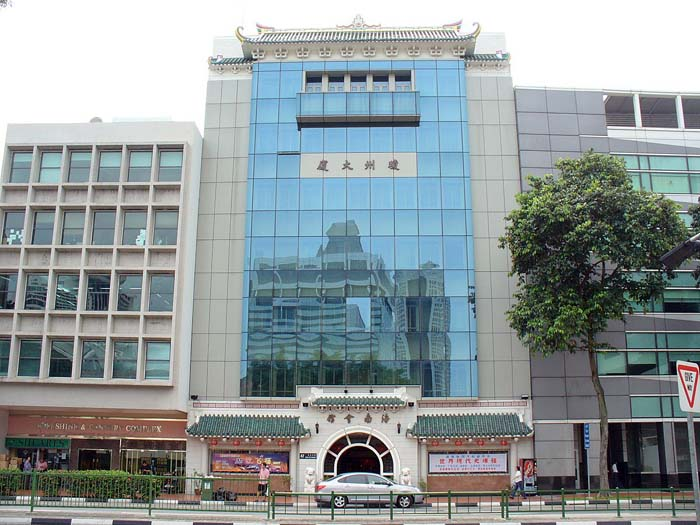
The Hainanese association, Kheng Chiu Hwee Kuan is located along Middle Road, Singapore. Taken in July 2007.

The Hainanese Association of Singapore, Kheng Chiu Hwee Kuan and clan temple building was built in 1857 in three adjoining shop houses along No. 6, Malabar Street. In 1878, it moved to its present location along Middle Road, and later underwent renovations in 1963. The main deity of this temple was Tian Hou (or Ma Chor), the goddess of safe passage at sea. The temple has a wealth of valuable artefacts such as couplet scrolls by famous personalities, rare bronze guard of honour, stone tablets and inscribed boards.

Besides the main association and temple complex, an estimate of 21 additional sub-clan associations can be found along three connecting streets, mainly around Seah Street, differentiated not only by origin district on Hainan island, but also in combination with clan surnames. Hylam Street, (Transliteration for "Hainan") was named for the early Hainanese settlers that lived along Malabar Street. In early 1900s, the Hainanese community had moved to the Beach Road area to capitalise on the sea frontage and pier facilities. It was later called Japan Street when the nearby Japanese community took over its place.

=== Japanese community and enclave ===
The first Japanese resident who migrated to Singapore was Yamamoto Otokichi in 1862 and who died here in 1867. His remains were later reburied at the Japanese Cemetery Park in Hougang. Uta Matsuda, the first female Japanese settler, ran a grocery shop with her Chinese husband in the 1860s. The Japanese introduced the Jinrickshaw to the local scene, a two-wheeled, passenger cart pulled by one person in 1894, which culminated in the building of the Jinricksha Station in early 1900s. They set up various Japanese shops and companies and the community increased substantially numbering 6,950 at the beginning of the 20th century.

=== Karayuki-san ===
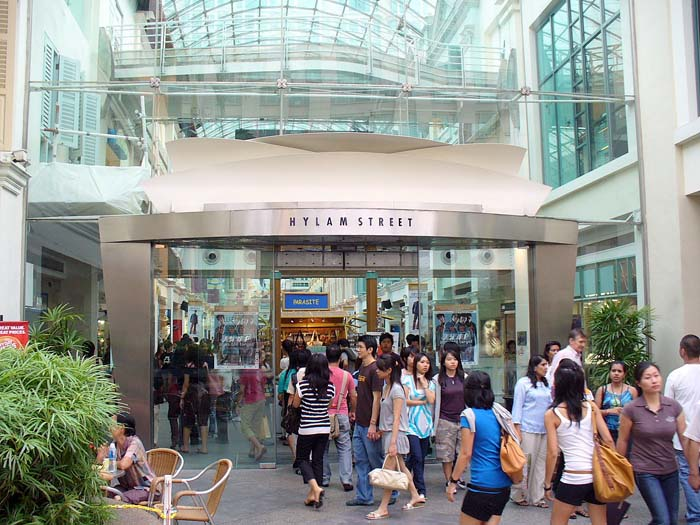
The Hylam Street has been incorporated within a shopping mall, Bugis Junction as an air-conditioned "indoor" street. Taken in July 2007.

The development of the Japanese enclave in Singapore was connected to the establishment of brothels east of the Singapore River, namely along Hylam, Malabar, Malay and Bugis Streets during the late 1890s. The Japanese prostitutes or Karayuki-san dubbed Malay Street as Suteretsu, a transliteration of the English word "street". A Japanese reporter in 1910 described the scene for the people of Kyūshū in a local newspaper, the Fukuoka Nichinichi:

Around nine o'clock, I went to see the infamous Malay Street. The buildings were constructed in a western style with their facades painted blue. Under the verandah hung red gas lanterns with numbers such as one, two or three, and wicker chairs were arranged beneath the lanterns. Hundreds and hundreds of young Japanese girls were sitting on the chairs calling out to passers-by, chatting and laughing... most of them were wearing yukata of striking colours... Most of them were young girls under 20 years of age. I learned from a maid at the hotel that the majority of these girls came from Shimabara and Amakusa in Kyūshū...

The booming of the brothels in the Southeast Asian regions was followed by the migration of merchants, shopkeepers, doctors and bankers to bolster the economy of a country yet unable to compete globally as a modern industrial nation. With the abolition of prostitution in Singapore in 1920, these trades replaced the brothel "business" and sustained the community that by then had its own newspaper, Nanyo Shimpo (1908), a cemetery (1911), a school (1912) and a clubhouse (1917).

By 1926, the Japanese community in Singapore had grown to occupy the area bound roughly by Prinsep Street, Rochor Road, North Bridge Road and Middle Road, alongside the Hainanese and other enclaves. Middle Road was known to the Japanese community as Central Street (Japanese: 中央通り, Hepburn: Chuo-Dori).

During the Japanese heyday in Middle Road, the area was synonymous with the Echigoya, a Japanese draper shop. The Echigoya sold high-quality textiles to Japanese and non-Japanese customers alike. The textiles and clothing were stored in full-height timber cabinets that ran along the length of the ground level walls. On one length side, a raised platform was also constructed, known as Koagari, where customers would sit while they examine the merchandise.

=== Demise ===
Most of the Japanese community was repatriated to mainland Japan after the end of the Second World War. Furthermore, for four subsequent years up to 1950, no Japanese person was allowed re-entry into Singapore. In the period leading up to the independence of Singapore in 1965, the former existence of a Japanese enclave in the surrounding area of Middle Road, and its connections to commercial and everyday life in pre-war Singapore were displaced to ameliorate the memory of the "replacement" Asian colonisers. Although the Japanese community began to show significant growth again in the early 1970s as Japanese businesses shifted manufacturing activities out of the mainland, the enclave became dilapidated by the end of the 1980s and many of its shophouses have since been demolished.

== Past landmarks ==
Alhambra Cinema was formerly located at the junction of Beach Road and Middle Road, next to the former Marlborough Cinema, another landmark building in the area. The Cinema was built in 1907 by motion picture industry pioneer, Tan Cheng Kee. It was one of the pioneer cinema halls in the early 1930s and was the first Singapore cinema to have air-conditioning. Alhambra Cinema was nicknamed Hai Kee ("by the sea" in Hainanese) due to its proximity to the sea. The Alhambra Cinema was eventually demolished to make way for the construction of Shaw Towers in the 1970s.

== See also ==
- Jackson Plan
- Sungei Road
- Japanese people in Singapore
- Japanese Cemetery Park
