= Tani Yutaka =

Japanese vigilante and spy (1911–1942)

- 谷豊
- Born: Yutaka Tani; November 6, 1911; Minami-ku, Fukuoka, Japan
- Died: 17 March 1942 (aged 30); Shonan, Malaya, Japan
- Other names: Mohd Ali bin Abdullah; Tiger of Malaya
- Occupations: Vigilante, spy, saboteur

Yutaka Tani (谷豊, Tani Yutaka; Jawi: تاني يوتاکا; 6 November 1911 – 17 March 1942), was a Japanese-born vigilante and saboteur active in British Malaya (now Malaysia).

== Biography ==
Tani Yutaka was born in Minami-ku, Fukuoka, and moved to Malaya with his family. After he took his education in Japan, his family returned to Malaya, where he lived at Kuala Terengganu where they worked at a shop. There, he converted to Islam after being influenced by the local Malay culture of his friends, and adopted the name Mohd Ali bin Abdullah. He also secretly married a Malay woman, but they later divorced. In 1931, when he was 20 years old, he returned to Japan for a military inspection. Although he worked for a shoe company, he missed his home and returned to Malaya.

On 6 November 1933, a Chinese man killed and beheaded Tani's two sisters over the Mukden Incident. Seeking revenge against the man and his gang, he became a bandit known as Harimau (Malay for 'Tiger'). Tani attacked some Chinese gangs and British officers, and gave away what he looted from rich officials to the poor, which made him into a local hero. He was then arrested at Hat Yai and imprisoned for two months.

Before World War II, he became a secret agent for the Imperial Japanese Army, sabotaging the British war effort.

== Death and legacy ==
He died in Singapore where he is buried in the Japanese Cemetery Park. However, the accounts of his exact death differed: some sources claimed that he was killed during a mission to sabotage a dam at Johor, while others claim that he succeeded in the sabotage, and either died of his wounds or from malaria. He is one of the soldiers who were enshrined at the Yasukuni Shrine, in spite of his Muslim faith.

== In popular culture ==
His life story has been depicted in novels and in the films Marai no Tora (1943) and Harimau (1989).
