= Knightsbridge House International School =

School in Singapore

Location
- Singapore; 1.2826°N 103.8186°E

Information
- Type: Independent, co-educational international school
- Established: August 2021
- Founder: John Fearon
- Campus: Bukit Merah Central, Changi, Nonthaburi Thailand
- Affiliation: Cambridge International Education
- Website: https://www.kbh.edu.sg

Knightsbridge House International School (KBH), founded in August 2021 in Singapore by John Fearon, is an independent co-educational international school offering the Cambridge International Curriculum across Primary, Lower Secondary, IGCSE and A Levels. KBH operates three campuses across Singapore and Thailand, with two in Singapore (Bukit Merah and Changi) and one in Thailand.

== History ==
In January 2022, Knightsbridge House International School inaugurated a campus in Bukit Merah Central, Singapore. The School achieved the highest average test scores globally in the Cambridge MidYIS Assessment for four consecutive years (2023–2026).

In 2024, Knightsbridge House International School obtained accreditation from Cambridge.

In August 2025, the school launched its Changi campus to accommodate growing enrolment.

By September 2025, Knightsbridge House International School had expanded to serve more than 500 students from Year 1 through Year 11, reflecting significant growth since its establishment in 2021.

In August 2026, Knightsbridge House International School commenced offering Cambridge International A Level programmes, extending its academic pathway to students through Year 13.

== Overview ==
Knightsbridge House International School delivers the Cambridge curriculum across Primary, Lower Secondary, IGCSE and A Levels. With campuses at Bukit Merah Central and Changi Business Park in Singapore, the school serves more than 650 students from Year 1 to Year 13.

Knightsbridge House International School provides education for Year 1 to Year 13 students, with a bilingual Mandarin program, an English medium program. Students Year 1-13 follow the Cambridge Curriculum. School has Cambridge Primary curriculum for students age 5–11, Cambridge International Lower Secondary Curriculum for lower secondary school (age 11–13), Cambridge International General Certificate of Secondary Education for upper secondary school (age 14–16) and Cambridge International AS & A Level (age 16-18).

== See also ==
- List of international schools in Singapore
