= Invictus International School =

Private international school in Singapore

Coordinates: 1.30131°N 103.81247°E

Invictus International School (Singapore)

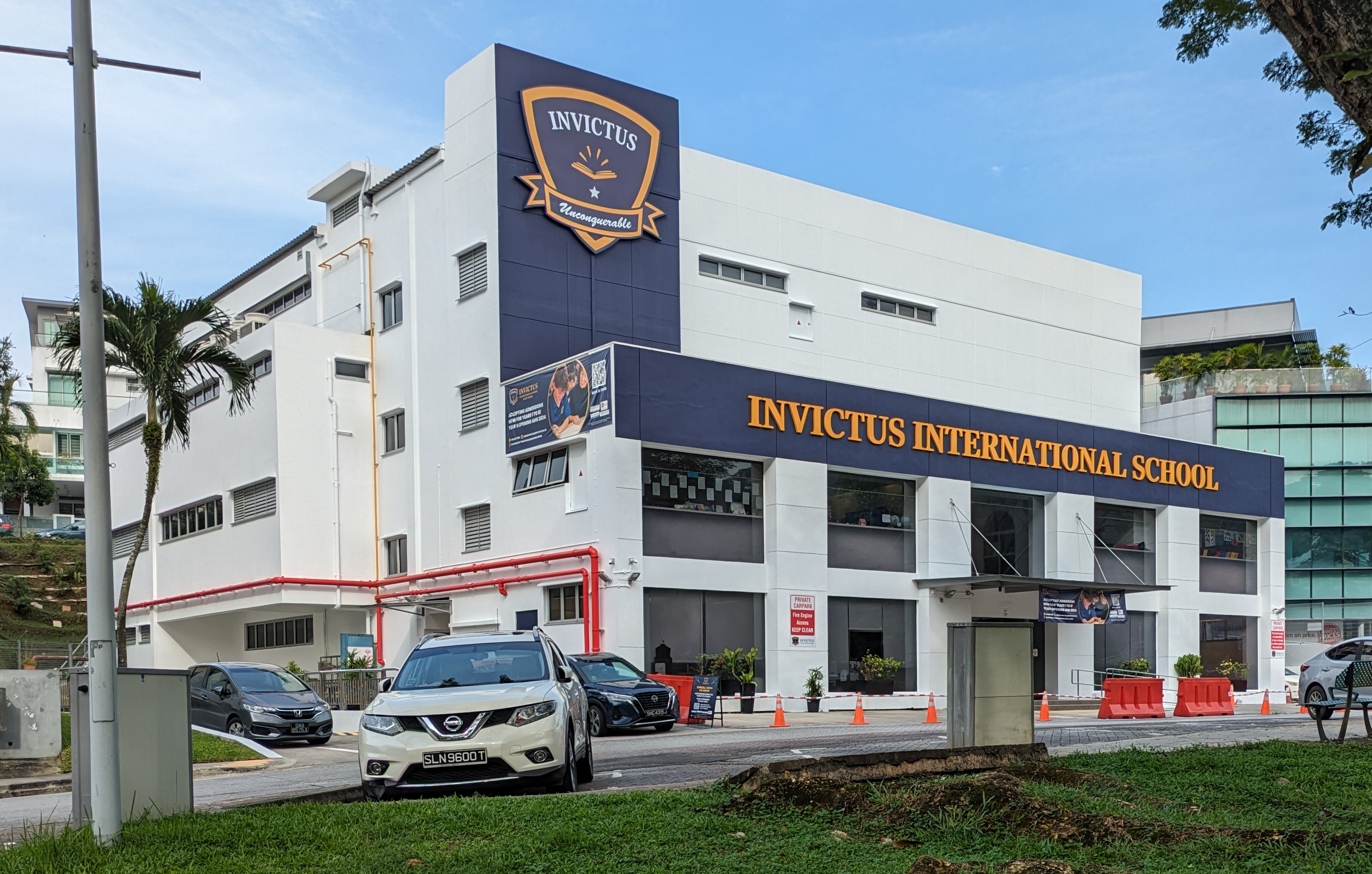
- Bukit Timah campus

Location
- Centrium Square: 320 Serangoon Road #06-01; Singapore 218108 Dempsey Hill: 73 Loewen Road #01-21; Singapore 248843 Bukit Timah: 191 Upper Bukit Timah Road; Singapore 588180

Information
- School type: Private International School
- Motto: The Global Family School
- Established: 2015
- Founders: Dr. Mark Hon & Mr. John Anthony Fearon
- Enrolment: Open for admission throughout the year. Academic year starts in August.
- Classes offered: Year 1 to 13
- Language: English and Mandarin
- Website: https://www.invictus.edu.sg/

Invictus International School is a co-educational international school based in Singapore that offers kindergarten, primary and secondary education. It was co-founded by John Fearon and Dr Mark Hon in 2015, and promotes itself as an affordable option for international students. The school is one of the brands owned by Sing-Ed Global Schoolhouse (Sing-Ed). From October 2021, the Invictus group is wholly owned by Sing-Ed.

The school has campuses in Singapore, Malaysia, Hong Kong, Thailand, China and Cambodia, where it adopts the International Primary Curriculum (IPC) and International Middle Years Curriculum (IMYC). In the upper years, students are offered to sit for the IGCSE and Cambridge A Level Examinations.

== Invictus International School List ==
Singapore

- Invictus International School Singapore, Bukit Timah Campus
- Invictus International School Singapore, Dempsey Campus
- Invictus International School Singapore, Centrium Campus

Cambodia

- Invictus International School Cambodia, Phnom Penh Campus

Hong Kong

- Invictus International School Hong Kong, Tseung Kwan O Campus
- Invictus Secondary School Hong Kong, Chai Wan Campus

Malaysia

- Invictus International School Malaysia, Horizon Hills Campus
- Invictus International School Malaysia, Spring Hills Campus

Thailand

- Invictus International Programme Thailand

== Curriculum ==
Invictus is an all-through international school with students from Years 1 to 6 (ages 5-11) in primary school and students from Years 7 to 13 (ages 11-18) in secondary school.

The school utilises the Cambridge Primary Curriculum.
