= Japanese School Singapore =

Coordinates: 1.30025°N 103.76919°E

The Japanese School Singapore
- シンガポール日本人学校

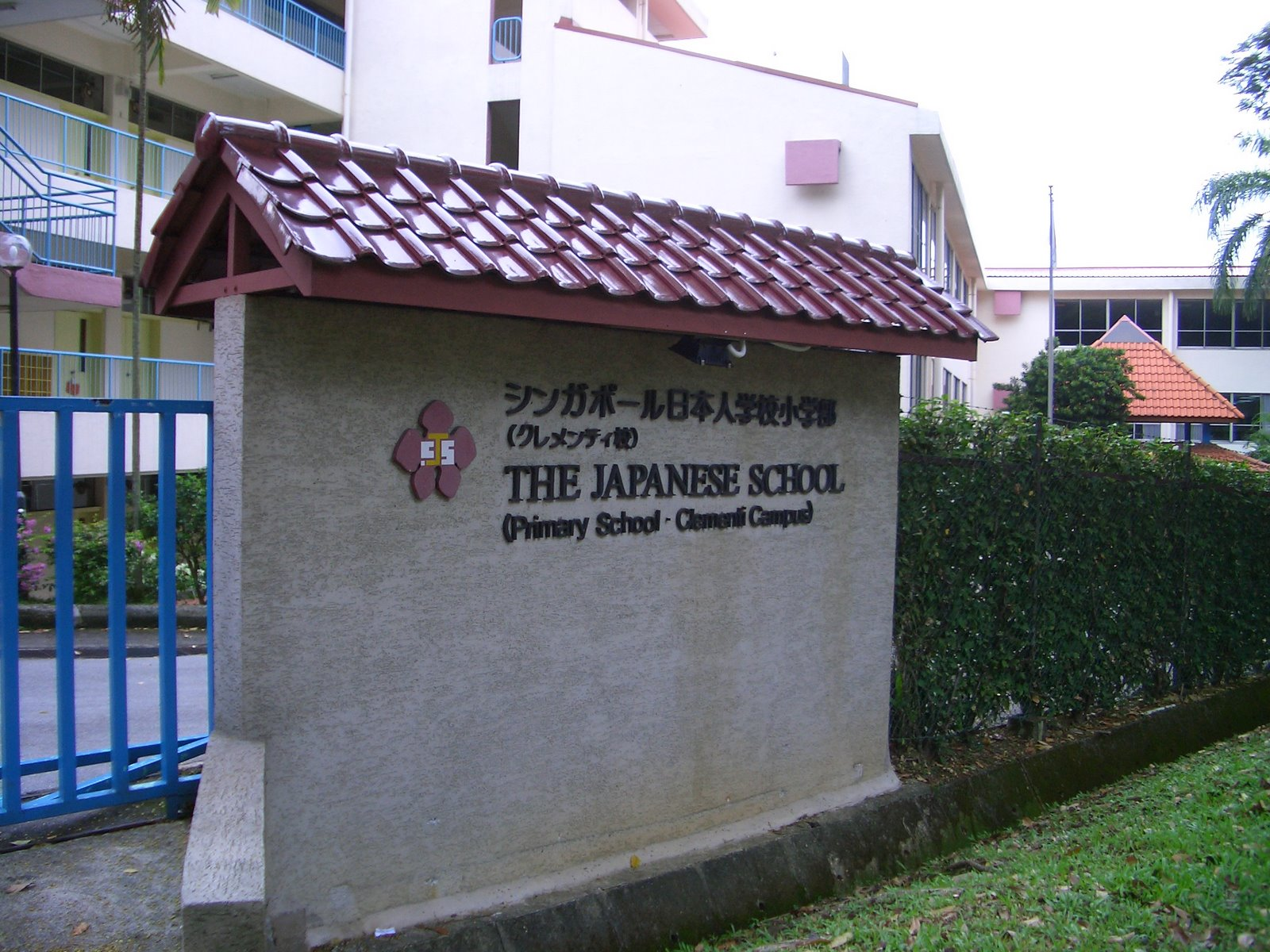
- The Japanese School Primary School Clementi Campus

Location
- Secondary: 201 West Coast Road; Singapore 127383 Clementi: 95 Clementi Road; Singapore 129782 Changi: 11 Upper Changi Road North; Singapore 507657; Singapore

Information
- Type: Elementary and junior high school
- Established: 1912
- Grades: 1–9
- Website: https://www.sjs.edu.sg/

The Japanese School Singapore (シンガポール日本人学校, Shingapōru Nihonjin Gakkō) is a Japanese international school in Singapore, covering elementary and junior high school levels. There are two separate elementary schools of the JSS in Clementi and Changi, while junior high school division is located in West Coast. As of 2013 this Japanese international school is the largest overseas Japanese school in the world.

Campuses

== History ==
The original school was founded in 1912 and opened at 131 Middle Road. At the time, one teacher taught 28 students. A new school built by The Japan Club, now known as The Japanese Association, opened at 155 Waterloo Street in 1920. As of 2014 the Stamford Girls' School is located at that site. Prior to the start of World War II the school had moved to several different sites: Bencoolen Street, Wilkie Road, and Short Street. In 1941, when the war started, the British Army closed the school. When the Japanese occupied Singapore, the government opened the Shonan First People's School. In 1945 the British re-took Singapore and closed the Shonan school.

A Japanese school facility opened in 1964 at what is now the Newton Post Office on Bukit Timah Road. It closed in July 1966. In September 1966 the Japanese government officially re-established the Japanese school with 3 teachers and 27 students. At first it had only primary school and was located in a residential building in Dalvey Estate. This facility closed in March 1968. In April 1968 the school moved to Swiss Cottage Estate, the black and white bungalow. The secondary school opened in 1970. The primary school and the secondary school at Swiss Cottage Estate closed in July 1971. The school moved to West Coast Road, where it opened in August of that year. In 1971 the school had 171 students. In 1976 this number increased to 588. Due to the increase in students and the strain on the existing campus, the school's West Coast campus closed in March 1976 and the school moved to a newly built campus Clementi Road.

In 1984 construction was completed a new secondary school campus on West Coast Road. During that year about 2,000 students attended the campuses of the Japanese school. In April 1995 the Japanese Primary School Changi Campus opened, taking grades 5 through 6, while the Clementi campus served grades 1 through 4. Beginning in April 1998 the two primary schools began functioning as separate 1–6 campuses with different principals. As of April 1998 there were a total of 2,445 students and 163 teachers in the school system, with 993 students at the Changi primary campus, 836 students at the Clementi campus, and 616 students at the secondary campus.

== Divisions and campuses ==
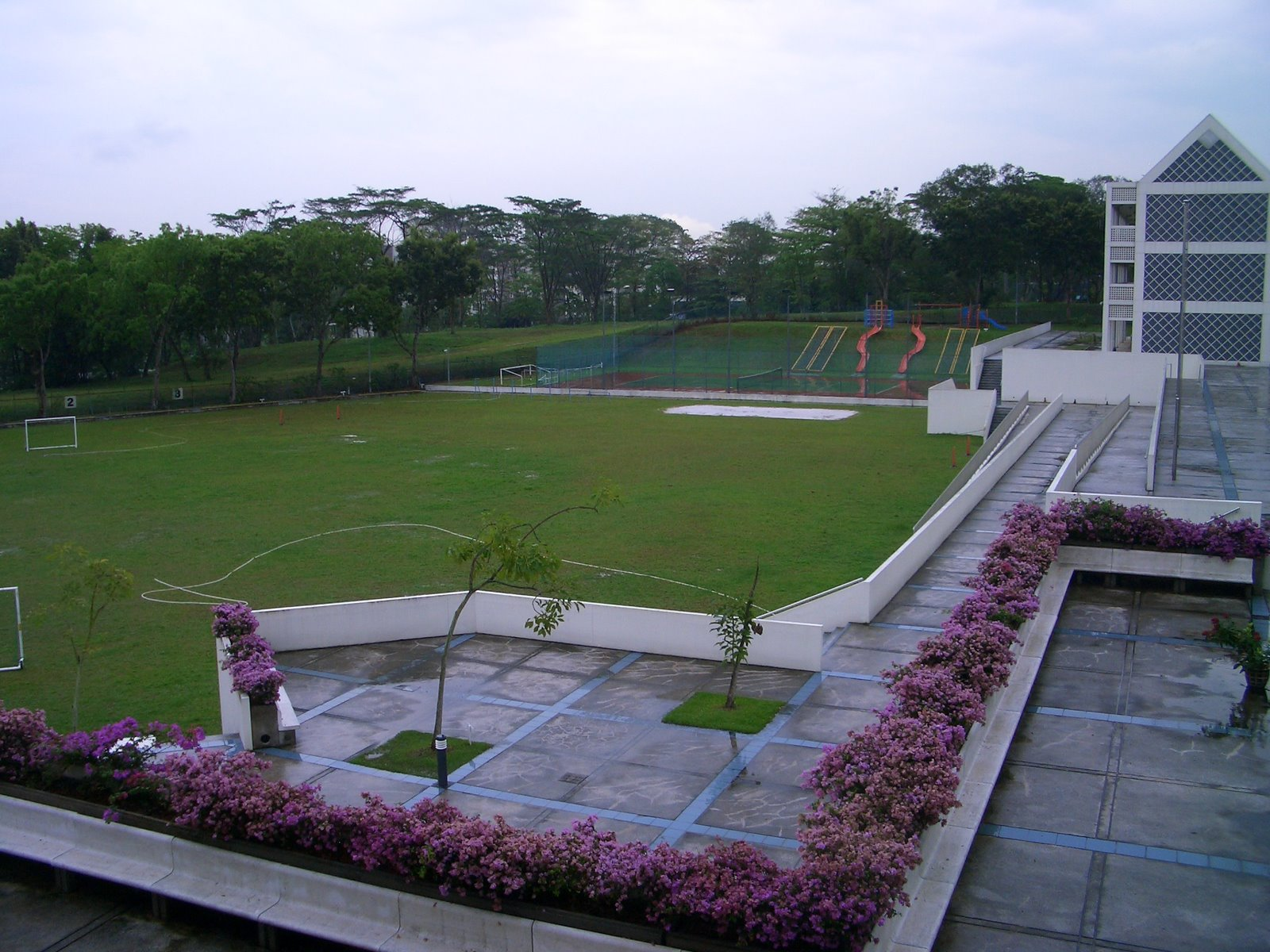
Changi campus

The 20,825-square-metre (224,160 sq ft) Clementi Campus has served as the school's headquarters after the Clementi and Changi primary schools were separated in 1998. This campus is across from the National University of Singapore. The campus includes an auditorium, a gymnasium, two libraries, an audiovisual studio, a laboratory, a sports field, a computer laboratory, a swimming pool, two playgrounds, music immersion rooms, a pet corner, and rooms for specialised studies including home economics, music, and arts and crafts. The campus includes heritage rooms for the display of historical items and books and photographs valued by the community.

The 44,100-square-metre (475,000 sq ft) Changi Campus was built to resemble a traditional Japanese house. The campus includes an auditorium, a gymnasium, a multi-purpose hall, and rooms for specialised studies including English conversation, music, and arts and crafts. The campus also includes a display room for international programmes.

The Japanese Secondary School is located in the West Coast Campus. Most first year students at the junior high school level had matriculated from the elementary school division of the Japanese School Singapore. Some students entering the first year of junior high school had previously attended schools in Japan. The 17,015-square-metre (183,150 sq ft) junior high school campus includes a gymnasium/auditorium, a library, a swimming pool, a sports field, a tennis court, computer laboratories, a playground, audio-visual rooms, specialised studies rooms for arts and crafts and for music and arts, a science laboratory, a language laboratory.

== See also ==
- Japanese expatriates in Singapore
- Waseda Shibuya Senior High School in Singapore (Japanese international high school in Singapore)
