= Chatsworth International School =

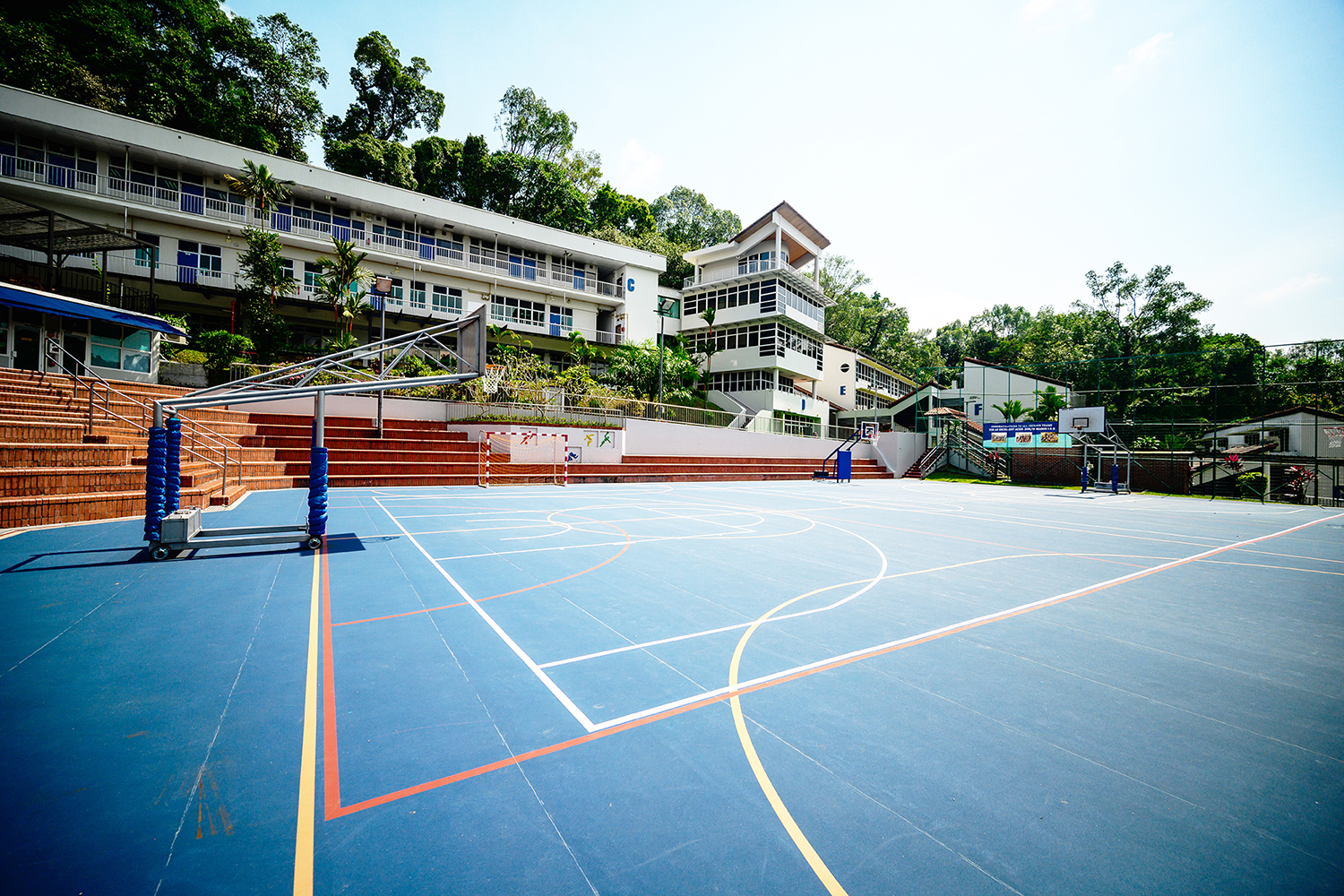

Location
- 72 Bukit Tinggi Road; Singapore 289760; Singapore; 1.3455°N 103.7893°E

Information
- School type: International Baccalaureate (IB) - Primary Years, Middle Years and Diploma Programs
- Motto: Inspire, Educate, Enlighten
- Established: January 1995; 31 years ago
- Principal: Tyler Sherwood
- Grades: K1–Y13 (Grade 12)
- Age range: 3 to 18+
- Mascot: Phoenix
- Website: https://www.chatsworth.com.sg/

Chatsworth International School is a co-educational international school in Bukit Tinggi, Singapore, for students from kindergarten to Year 13 (Grade 12), aged 3 to 18. It is an International Baccalaureate World School and is authorised to provide the International Baccalaureate Primary Years Programme (IBPYP), Middle Years Programme (IBMYP) and Diploma Programme (IBDP).

Chatsworth International School is fully accredited by the Western Association of Schools and Colleges (WASC) and is EduTrust certified by the Committee for Private Education (CPE) in Singapore. It is also a member of East Asia Regional Council of Schools (EARCOS), The Principals’ Training Centre (PTC) and Overseas Association for College Admission Counselling (OACAC).

== History ==
Chatsworth International School opened in January 1995. A handful of students and teachers founded the school in Upper Serangoon.

In 1998, Chatsworth moved to a centrally located campus off Orchard Road, the original home of the Singapore Chinese Girls’ School, which is designated as a heritage site.

Chatsworth opened an international primary campus in the East in 2005. In August 2018, Chatsworth International School opened a permanent campus at Bukit Timah, catering to students from Kindergarten to Year 13. The East Campus was closed in June 2018, following the closure of the Orchard Campus in June 2020. The land was returned to the local authorities.

== Location and facilities ==
Chatsworth International School is located next to Bukit Timah Nature Reserve. And is located in the vicinity of the Sixth Avenue MRT station. The school is equipped with facilities including a multi-purpose/performance hall, indoor sports hall, swimming pool, football pitch, sheltered amphitheatre, drama room, maker space, music practice rooms, and rooms.

== Curriculum ==
Students from K1 to Year 6 (ages 3 to 11) follow the IB Primary Years Programme. The IB Middle Years Programme is offered to students from Years 7 to 11 (ages 12 to 15). Year 12 and 13 students (ages 16 to 18) take the IB Diploma Programme.

== Activities ==
Chatsworth International School is a member of the Athletics Conferences of Singapore International Schools, (ACSIS) where students aged 8 to 19 years old from Singapore’s international schools compete.

Co-curricular activities (CCAs) are offered for students from Year 1 before and after school. In addition to team-based sports, these include arts, leadership, clubs and special interests. Chatsworth also participates in regional events involving the Arts such as the International Schools Theatre Association (ISTA) events and International Schools Art Exhibition
