= Canadian International School (Singapore) =

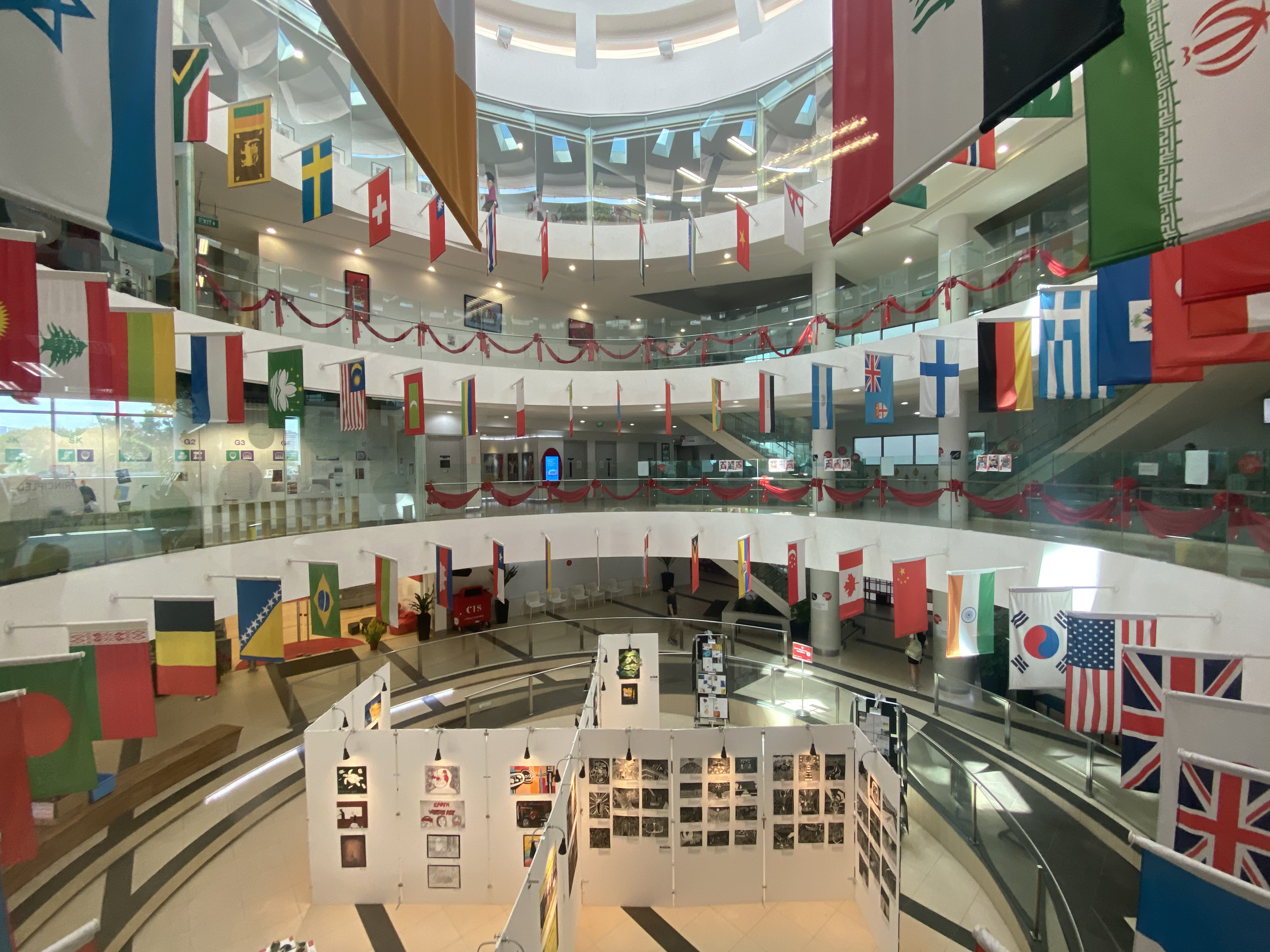
- View of the school atrium from the primary library

Location
- 7 Jurong West Street 41; Singapore, 649414; Singapore; 1.345093°N 103.727429°E

Information
- Former name: Canadian Overseas College
- Type: Private International school
- Established: 1989
- Founders: Group of Chinese-Canadian investors
- Status: Open
- Headmaster: Jared Nolan
- Head of school: Dr Allan Weston
- Grades: Nursery - Grade 12
- Gender: Co-educational
- Enrollment: 3,100
- Language: English with additional language in: Chinese, French, Spanish
- Mascot: Husky
- Accreditation: International Baccalaureate
- Programmes: PYP, MYP, DP, Bilingual (Chinese - English, & French- English), STEAM, Open Minds
- Website: https://www.cis.edu.sg/

The Canadian International School (CIS) is an international school in Singapore. Opened in 1989 as the Canadian Overseas College (COC) in Toh Tuck, it started out as a university preparatory day school for grades 9 to 13 under the Ontario Academic Credit (OAC) system. Although it initially had not many students, the student population quickly grew in 1992 due to a spillover from other international schools in Singapore. In August of that year, it expanded to include grades 7 and 8, with its name changed to the Canadian International School a month. In March 1993, it expanded its programme to include kindergarten to grade 6.

In August 2001, CIS opened a new campus in Bukit Tinggi, Bukit Timah, and moved its grade 9-12 students there as well as their grade 7-8 students two years later. In August 2006, the grade 9-12 students were moved to a new campus in Kampong Bahru whilst the grade 4-6 students moved to the Bukit Tinggi campus. In 2008, it opened a new campus in Tanjong Katong. In March 2012, a new campus was opened in Lakeside. In October 2011, the Toh Tuck campus closed down. In June 2023, the TK campus was closed down as well.

CIS operates under the International Baccalaureate (IB) Primary (IB PYP), Middle Years (IB MYP), and Diploma (IB DP) programs. The school accepts students from Nursery to Grade 12. In 2025, CIS started a new programme called the Extended Pathway, mixing Advanced Placement courses with Diploma Programme courses.

== History ==
The school was established in 1989 by a group of Canadian-Chinese investors and opened in November 1990 as a university preparatory day school at Toh Tuck known as the Canadian Overseas College (COC) in response to "the need for a Canadian system of education in the ASEAN region" by expatriates. It was fully accredited by the Ontario Ministry of Education as well as offered education from grades 9 to 13 as a part of the Ontario Academic Credit (OAC) system and issued the Ontario Secondary School Diploma (OSSD) to graduating students. In 1991, the school only had 40 students attending the school, though by 1992, there were 300 students attending the school due to a spillover from Dover Court International School and United World College, which was caused by an influx of expat students. In September 1992, it changed its name to the Canadian International School. Around a month earlier, the school expanded its education to grade 7 and 8. In March 1993, it expanded its programme from kindergarten to grade 6. In September of the same year, the school starting offering Mandarin as a second language, with 15 students signing up for the elective. It was later made compulsory for primary students in 1994.

In August 2001, CIS opened a new campus in Bukit Tinggi, Bukit Timah, and moved its grade 9-12 students there. Two years later, the grade 7-8 students were moved there, making the Toh Tuck campus a primary student-only campus. However, in August 2006, the grade 4-6 students moved to the Bukit Tinggi campus whilst the grade 9-12 students moved to a new campus in Kampong Bahru as the student population was growing. In 2002, the school was authorised by the International Baccalaureate (IB) to offer the Diploma Programme (DP). A year later, it was authorised to offer the Middle Years Programme (MYP). In May 2005, it was authorised to offer the Primary Years Programme (PYP).

In 2008, the SLA approved CIS' plans to reuse the former Tanjong Katong Girls' Secondary School campus at Tanjong Katong Road as a part of its Tanjong Katong Campus. When CIS took over the building, the school hall had " broken windows and a big hole in the roof... the requirement was to restore the hall to its original look and state" according to Angela Henderson, the school's principal. The damages were subsequently fixed and the school hall was refurbished with new flooring and a fresh coat of paint for the stage. The Tanjong Katong Campus closed in June 2023, and students transferred to the Lakeside campus in August 2023.

On 21 March 2012, the Lakeside Campus of CIS was opened by then Education Minister S. Iswaran. Talks were made with other schools on sharing playing spaces. In January 2023, CIS opened the Toh Tuck Wing, a Kindergarten wing and sporting facility.

In June 2020, China Maple Leaf Educational Systems Limited acquired CIS in a deal valued at S$680 million.

Today, CIS is a full-program International Baccalaureate (IB) school in Singapore, housing children in nursery to grade 12. Programs include Chinese-English and French-English bilingual programs, STEAM, and Open Minds.

== Curriculum ==
CIS offers the IB PYP, MYP, and DP programmes.

=== Language program ===
CIS's language program is delivered in three pathways: English, Chinese-English bilingual, and French-English bilingual (primary school only). In the English program, students can select an additional language, and language choices are:

- Chinese, French, or Spanish (Spanish offered in Secondary only)

The school provides two bilingual programs. The Chinese-English bilingual program is offered to children in nursery to grade 6, with pathways for the Chinese-English bilingual program in grades 7–12. The French-English program is offered for children in senior kindergarten to grade 6. The program sees children immersed in both languages 50% of the time.

== Campuses ==
=== Toh Tuck ===
The Toh Tuck Campus was CIS's first campus, located in the region of the same name. It opened in November 1990 and occupied the former Toh Tuck Primary School building. It initially had 90 students out of its capacity of 400 students and 7 teachers with a student-teacher ratio of 1:14. It also had badminton, volleyball, basketball, table-tennis, soccer, squash, and baseball facilities. By October 2011, the campus closed down and its students and faculty moved to the new campus in Lakeside, with the Nanyang Primary School taking over. The building was demolished in 2014 for private housing. The principal was Wayne Macinnis and the vice-principal was Mathew Steufureak.

=== Tanjong Katong Campus ===
The Tanjong Katong Campus (1.303333°N 103.897222°E) was opened in September 2008 on the former site of the Tanjong Katong Girls' School. Block C of the Tanjong Katong campus is a Singapore Heritage-listed site.

Angela Henderson was the principal of the campus at the time of closure.

The campus was closed in June 2023 with students transferred to the Lakeside campus in August 2023.

=== Jurong West Campus ===
The Lakeside campus (1.3338°N 103.6696°E) is set on 43,000 sq.m. of land and provides students with facilities that include classrooms connected to learning pods, academic facilities, sporting, outdoor and playground facilities, as well as a performing and fine arts centre, 500-seat theatre, Olympic-sized swimming pool and junior pool, maker spaces, and a two-story library. It also features a 2,600 sqm outdoor learning play area called the Outdoor Discovery Centre that includes sand and water areas to support play-based learning.

== See also ==
- Canada–Singapore relations
