= Toh Tuck =

- Subzone of Clementi Planning Area

Name transcription(s)
  - Chinese: 道德
  - Malay: Toh Tuck
  - Tamil: தோ டக்
- Interactive map of Toh Tuck
- Coordinates: 1.3409476°N 103.7458116°E
- Country: Singapore

Toh Tuck is a residential area in the Western region of Singapore. It located east of Bukit Batok, north of Bukit Timah and south of Hillview estates. The northern part of the estate is in Bukit Batok, while the southern part is in Bukit Timah, with Toh Tuck Road being the border. It comprises several private housing estates and some public housing along Jalan Jurong Kechil. Beauty World, Bukit Timah Plaza, Bukit Timah Market and Beeh Low See Buddhist Temple are located at one end of the road.

== History ==
Historically, Toh Tuck was a small village.

Toh Tuck Secondary School was established in 1965 but it closed in 1991.

== Transport ==
Toh Tuck Road is one of the principal roads.

The area is served by the Downtown MRT line.
