= Overseas Association of College Admissions Counselors =

University and college admission

The Overseas Association of College Admissions Counselors (OACAC) was founded in 1991. The association began when a group of primarily European counselors met and approached the National Association of College Admissions Counseling (NACAC) about the creation of an affiliate regional organization that would represent overseas counselors. OACAC became a chartered regional association.

Membership is a privilege made available to eligible institutions, organizations, agencies and individuals as defined in the association’s Bylaws. OACAC is a not-for-profit organization (taxpayer ID 141-82-7265). The membership is made up of nearly 600 professionals from around the world who advise students as they make choices about pursuing postsecondary education.

OACAC members can be primary and secondary school counselors, independent counselors, college admission and financial aid officers, enrollment managers, and organizations engaged in guiding students through the secondary to higher education transition process.

== History ==
The conception of Overseas ACAC began with Gene Wallach, Counselor at the International School of Geneva. In the early 1970s, the European Council of International Schools (ECIS) was a small organization but colleges in the US were beginning to realize that students in ECIS schools were well qualified potential applicants. There was already a steady flow of students going to the US and recruitment staff from American universities were already visiting ECIS schools.

At the NACAC conference in St. Louis in the early 1980s a meeting was held to find a solution.

Although there was continued interest and Frank Burtnett, the new Executive Director of NACAC attended an ECIS conference in Amsterdam to continue the dialogue, there seemed to be no solution to the difficulty posed by the NACAC by-laws denying membership to proprietary schools. The idea was on the point of being abandoned when a representative of the US State Department encouraged the members to continue and introduced them to Joyce Smith who was asked to help progress the issue.

The group continued to grow as more counselors from Europe began to attend NACAC conferences. At the NACAC National Conference in New York City a small group of international counselors met together to discuss common concerns.

With Joyce Smith’s strong support and encouragement, the project moved ahead and at the 1992 conference in Los Angeles, Regina Manley, President of NACAC that year, proposed the amendment admitting proprietary schools to NACAC with the condition that the schools were accredited. The Amendment was approved and Overseas ACAC was established.

== Executive committee ==
2009-2010 Executive Board

- President: David Allen; British International School, Riyadh, Saudi Arabia
- President-Elect: Bridget Hererra; Escola Americana de Campinas, Brazil
- Past President: Jane Lowery; Asociación Escuelas Lincoln, Argentina
- Vice President for Finance: Jennifer Simons; Tufts University, U.S.
- Vice President for Membership: Raymond Marx; Colegio Americano de Quito, Ecuador
- Vice President for Admission/Enrollment Practices: Brian Zerbe; Carnegie Mellon University in Qatar, Qatar
- Vice President for Governmental Relations: Richard Eber; Cottey College, Missouri
- Vice President for Technology and Communication: Shaun McElroy; Shanghai American School, China
- Vice President for Professional Development: Sheri Neal Fischer; The American School in Japan Tokyo, Japan
