= National Association for College Admission Counseling =

American university and college admission organization

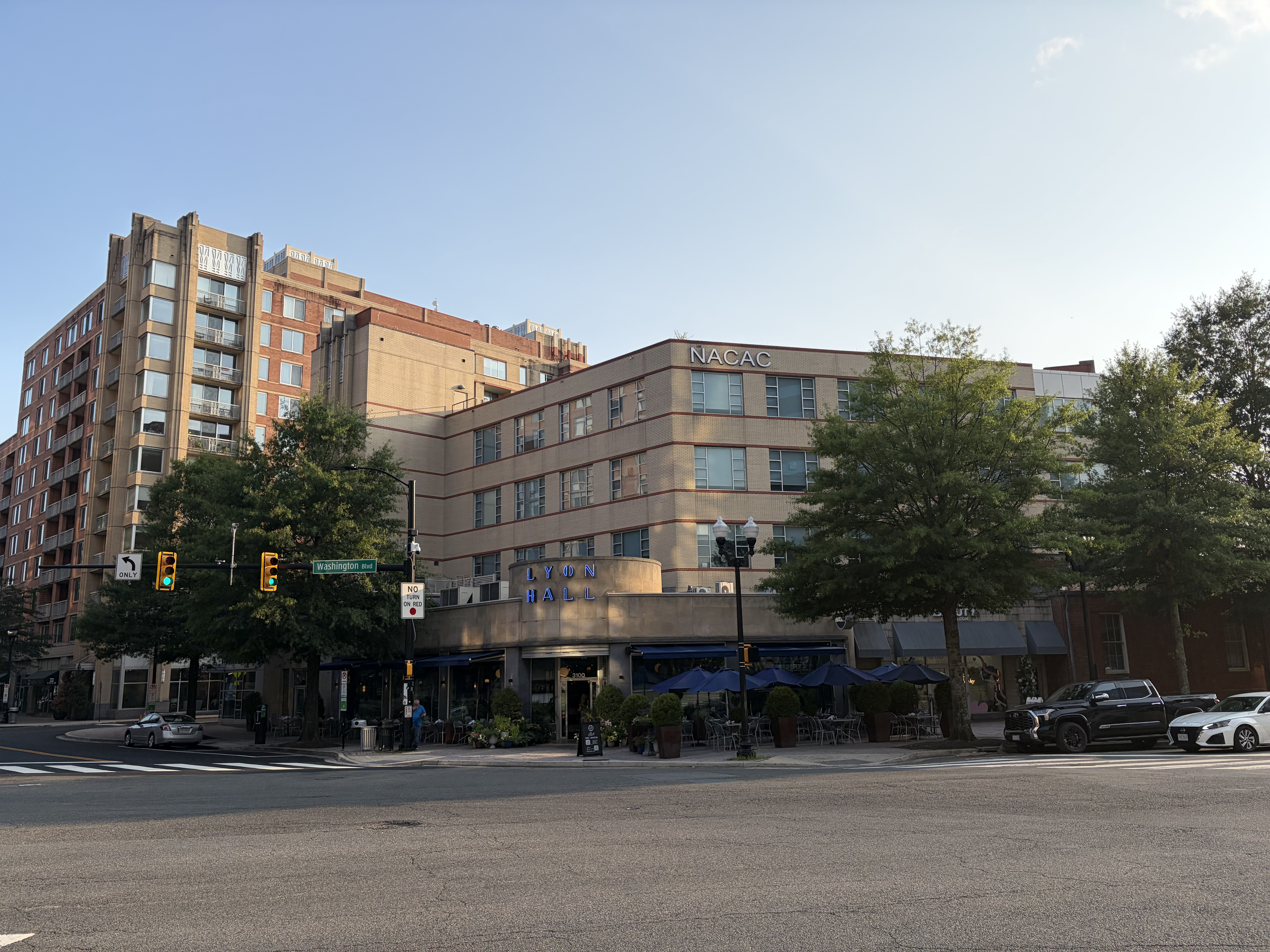
The NACAC headquarters in Arlington, Virginia

The National Association for College Admission Counseling (NACAC), founded in 1937, is an American organization of more than 25,000 professionals from around the world dedicated to serving students transitioning from secondary to postsecondary education. It includes professional school counselors at the secondary and postsecondary level, college access counselors, admission and financial aid officers, and others.

A member-directed organization, NACAC is governed by its voting members; an Assembly of delegates elected by voting members in NACAC's state and regional affiliates and by an elected Board of Directors.

NACAC holds several annual professional development events, including a national conference, and runs the National College Fairs program and Performing and Visual Arts College Fairs program which directly connect high school students with a wide variety of postsecondary institutions.

== College fairs ==
NACAC's National College Fair program provides the opportunity for students to meet college and university admission representatives to discuss courses, admission requirements, financial aid, and student life. Each year, more than 675,000 high school students and parents attend National College Fairs and NACAC's Performing & Visual Arts College Fairs. The fairs are held throughout the country in both the spring and fall and are free and open to the public.

== Regional affiliates ==
There are 23 regional affiliates of NACAC and they operate in a similar fashion and on a smaller scale.

Name	Abbreviation	Region
Dakota ACAC	DACAC	ND, SD
Greater Plains ACAC	GPACAC	KS, NE, OK
Hawaii ACAC	HACAC	HI
Illinois ACAC	IACAC	IL
Indiana ACAC	IACAC	IN
International ACAC	Intl ACAC	Outside the US and Caribbean
Iowa ACAC	IACAC	IA
Kentucky ACAC	KYACAC	KY
Michigan ACAC	MACAC	MI
Minnesota ACAC	MACAC	MN
Missouri ACAC	MOACAC	MO
New England ACAC	NEACAC	CT, ME, MA, NH, RI, VT
New Jersey ACAC	NJACAC	NJ
New York State ACAC	NYSACAC	NY
Ohio ACAC	OACAC	OH
Pacific Northwest ACAC	PNACAC	AK, ID, MT, OR, WA
Pennsylvania ACAC	PACAC	PA
Potomac and Chesapeake ACAC	PCACAC	DE, DC, MD, VA, WV
Rocky Mountains ACAC	RMACAC	AZ, CO, NM, UT, WY
Southern ACAC	SACAC	AL, AR, FL, GA, LA, MS, NC, SC, TN, Caribbean Islands
Texas ACAC	TACAC	TX
Western ACAC	WACAC	CA, NV
Wisconsin ACAC	WACAC	WI

== See also ==
- College admissions in the United States
- Higher education in the United States
- Overseas Association of College Admissions Counselors
- Transfer admissions in the United States
