= Waseda Shibuya Senior High School =

Private school in Singapore

- 早稲田大学系属早稲田渋谷シンガポール校

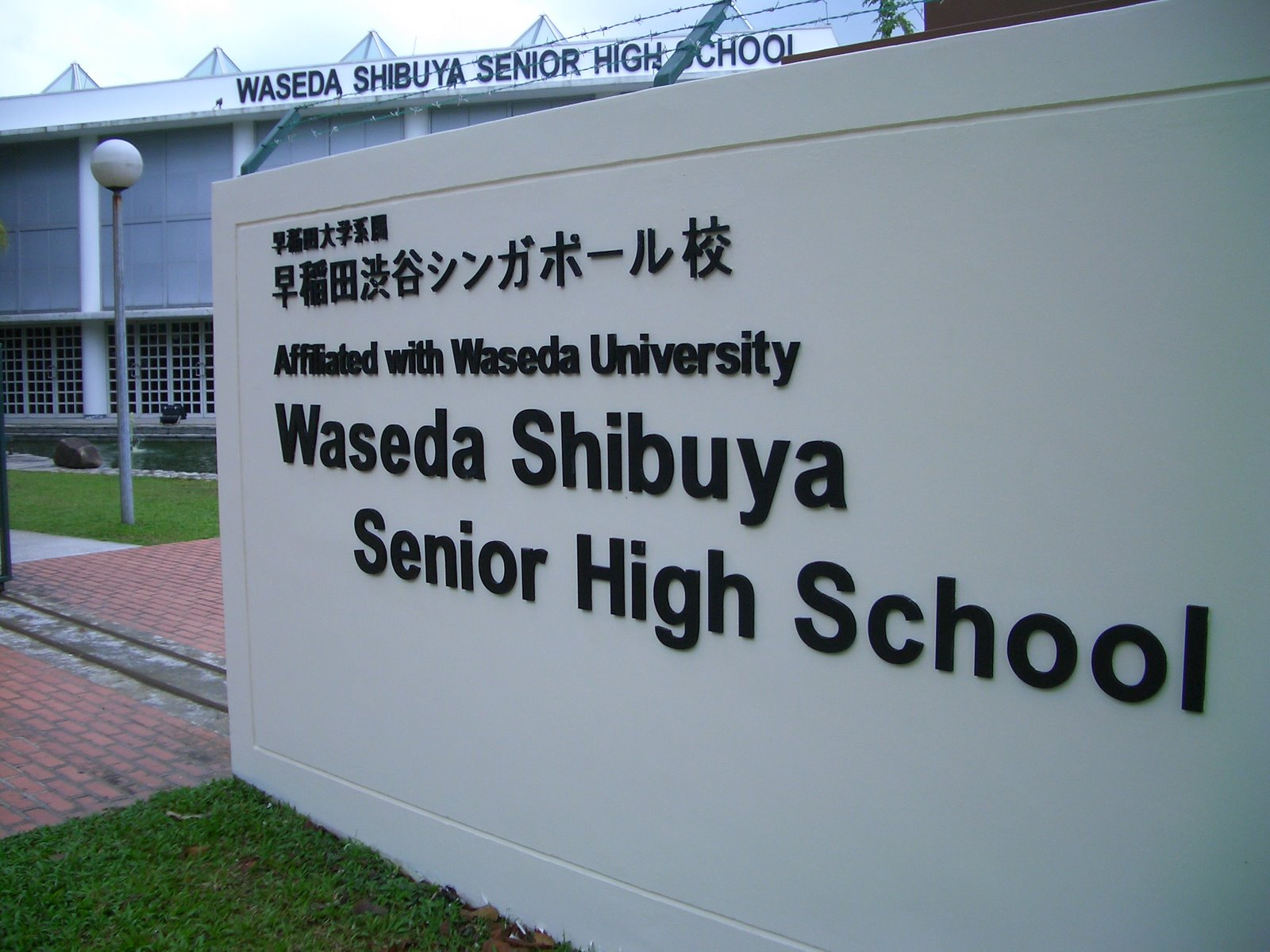

Location
- 57 West Coast Road; Singapore 127366; Singapore; 1°17′46.7″N 103°45′58.6″E

Information
- Type: High School
- Established: April 1991; 35 years ago
- Principal: Hikota Koguchi
- Language: Japanese
- Affiliation: Waseda University, Tokyo, Japan
- Website: https://www.waseda-shibuya.edu.sg/en/

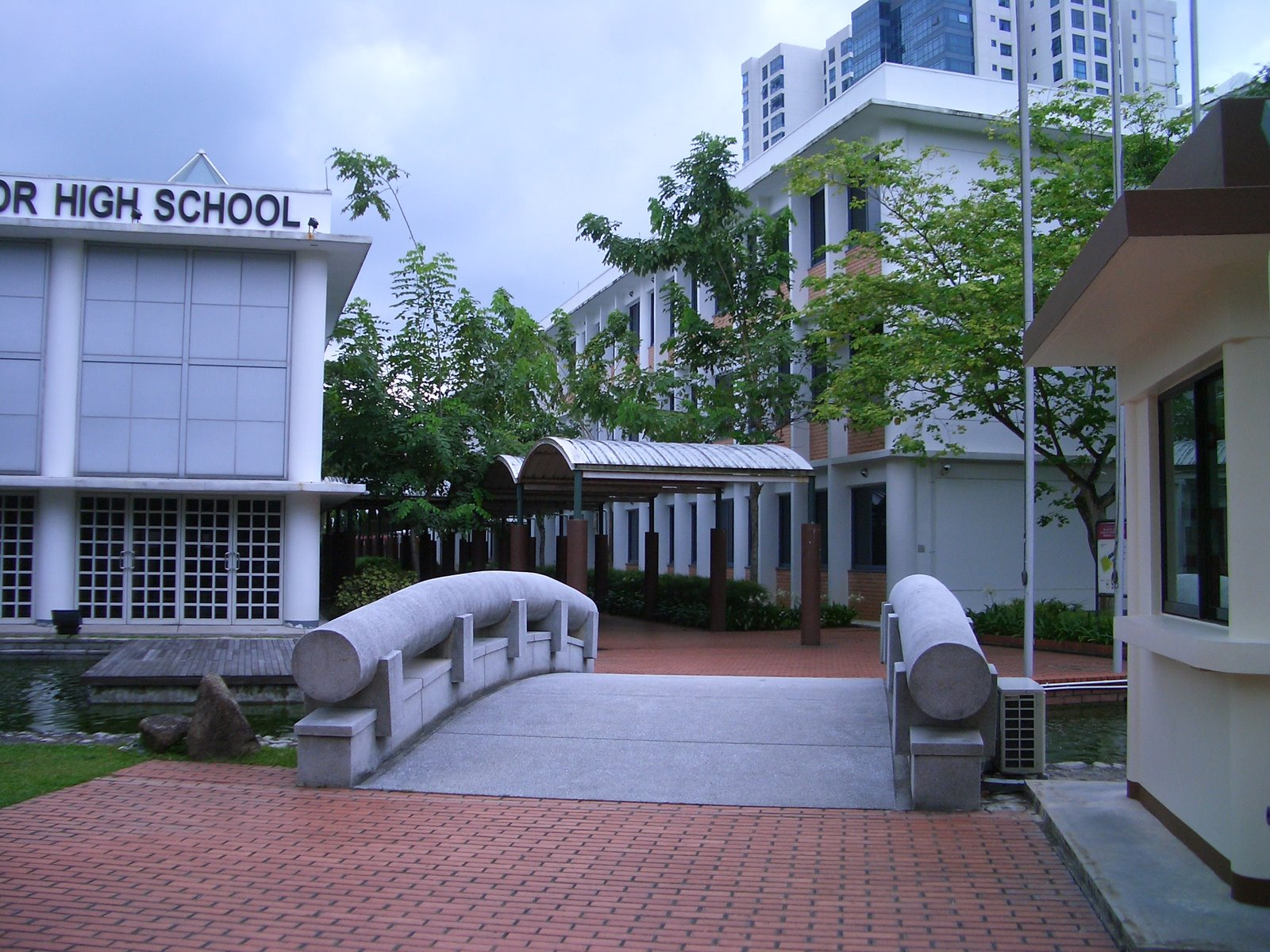
School campus

Waseda Shibuya Senior High School (Japanese: 早稲田大学系属早稲田渋谷シンガポール校, Hepburn: Waseda Daigaku-kei Zoku Waseda Shibuya Shingapōru Kō) is a Japanese school in West Coast, Singapore. It is affiliated with Waseda University in Shinjuku, Tokyo, making it a regional branch of a Japanese private school (Shiritsu zaigai kyōiku shisetsu), and is located on the city-state's western coast. The school is operated by Waseda Shibuya Senior High School Pte. Ltd.

== History ==
Waseda Shibuya Senior High School was founded in April 1991 as the Shibuya Makuhari Singapore School (渋谷幕張シンガポール校, Shibuya Makuhari Shingapōru Kō). The opening 10th-grade class included 50 Japanese students whose families lived in Singapore, Brunei, Malaysia, and Thailand. At the time the school was affiliated with the Shibuya Kyouiku Gakuen (渋谷教育学園, Shibuya Kyōiku Gakuen), the agency operating Makuhari Junior and Senior High School in Chiba, Chiba Prefecture. As of 1991 it was the only Japanese overseas boarding senior high school outside of the United States and Europe. Tetsuo Tamura (田村 哲夫 Tamura Tetsuo), who had served as the head of the Shibuya Kyouiku Gakuen, stated that he wished to establish an overseas Japanese school in Asia after learning about the sense of alienation from society many Japanese felt after returning from overseas. Tamura established a regional branch in Asia because he believed other Japanese international schools were too oriented to Europe and the United States.

The school first opened in a temporary facility for a local Japanese kindergarten. The Singaporean government leased 20,000 square metres (220,000 sq ft) of land to the school on terms described by Toshio Iwasaki of the Journal of Japanese Trade & Industry as "very favorable". In mid-1991 the construction of the school buildings, athletic facilities, and dormitory facilities finished. In September 1991, the students moved into the permanent campus for the second semester of the school year.

In April 2002 the school became affiliated with Waseda University. The school was renamed as "Waseda Shibuya Senior High School" to reflect the change.

== Admissions and Academic Information ==
The school also accepts graduates of Japanese junior high schools in Singapore and across the Asian region.

About 60% of this school's graduates move on to Waseda University. Other universities that have accepted students from Waseda Shibuya include Doshisha University, Hosei University, Kwansei University, Rikkyo University, and Ritsumeikan University.

The annual school festival is usually held in September, it was last held in 2024.

== Facilities ==
The school maintains dormitories, allowing students whose parents are transferred overseas to complete their high school education. The boarding school has 187 single occupancy rooms, with 116 for boys and 71 for girls. Currently, about 50% of the students reside in dormitories, while the remaining students reside with their families in Singapore.

The school has an astronomical observatory. As of 1991, as part of a Japan-Singapore educational exchange, the school opened the observatory to students attending local Singaporean secondary schools.

== See also ==
- Singapore-Japan relations
- Japanese people in Singapore
- The Japanese School Singapore (Japanese elementary and junior high school in Singapore)
