= Marai no Tora =

1943 Japanese film by Koga Masato

Marai no Tora マライの虎 The Tiger of Malaya
- Directed by: Koga Masato
- Written by: Keizo Kimura (writer)
- Starring: Koji Nakata; Ryo Akaboshi
- Production company: Daiei Film
- Release date: June 24, 1943
- Running time: 86 minutes
- Country: Japan
- Language: Japanese

Marai no Tora (マライの虎; lit. "The Tiger of Malaya") is a 1943 Japanese film directed by Koga Masato and starring Koji Nakata and Ryo Akaboshi.

It tells the story of Tani Yutaka, known as "Harimau" (Malay word for "Tiger") who was a secret agent for the Japanese military who died in a hospital in Singapore. It is debatable that Tani Yutaka is the true "Harimau Malaya" or "The Tiger of Malaya" and not Tomoyuki Yamashita.

== Cast ==
- Koji Nakata as Tani Yutaka
- Ryo Akaboshi as farmer
