= Murder of Celine Ng =

2011 disappearance and murder of a property agent in Singapore

- A photo of Celine Ng (left) and Ang Soo Hoon (in white) at Ng's birthday party, taken on the night before Ang killed Ng
- Location: West Coast, Singapore
- Date: 26 May 2011
- Attack type: Murder; Assisted suicide attempt
- Deaths: 1
- Injuries: 0
- Victim: Celine Ng Swee Peng (36)
- Perpetrator: Ang Soo Hoon (36)
- Motive: Provocation
- Charges: Murder (x1); Providing false information to the police (x1); Misappropriating the belongings of a dead person (x1)
- Verdict: Ang pleaded guilty to killing Ng in 2015; Ang sentenced to 12.5 years in jail
- Convictions: Manslaughter (x1); Providing false information to the police (x1); Misappropriating the belongings of a dead person (x1)
- Convicted: Ang Soo Hoon (36)
- Judge: Tay Yong Kwang

On 26 May 2011, the date of her 36th birthday, Singaporean property agent Celine Ng Swee Peng (黄瑞萍 Huáng Ruìpíng) disappeared after she was last seen by her flatmate, who reported her missing two days after Ng's disappearance. According to the flatmate, she heard Ng telling her she wanted to go overseas during a drinks session at her condominium, before she went to sleep and later awoke to find Ng missing. The police questioned Ng's family and friends, who all publicized her case to seek information of her whereabouts, which remained a mystery for more than a month. The police eventually conducted a nationwide search and 41 days after Ng's disappearance, the police found a skeleton left in the forest along Clementi Road, and the skeletal remains were confirmed to be Ng's after some DNA tests.

Ng's 36-year-old flatmate Ang Soo Hoon (洪素云 Hóng Sùyún), who first reported Ng missing, was arrested as a suspect and charged with allegedly murdering Ng, and Ang admitted that she tried to assist Ng in a suicide attempt, but she was provoked into strangling Ng after the victim allegedly insulted her for being "useless" (due to Ang failing to smother her). Ang was subsequently convicted of manslaughter, stealing Ng's belongings and giving a false account of Ng's disappearance, and sentenced to 12 years and six months in prison on 16 July 2015.

== Disappearance of Celine Ng ==
Celine Ng
- Born: Celine Ng Swee Peng; 26 May 1975; Singapore
- Died: 26 May 2011 (aged 36); West Coast Crescent, Singapore
- Cause of death: Possible strangulation, but exact cause of death unknown
- Education: Ngee Ann Polytechnic
- Occupation: Property agent
- Employer: CBRE Singapore
- Known for: Missing person turned murder victim

On 25 May 2011, a day before she supposedly disappeared, Celine Ng Swee Peng, a property agent, was celebrating her 36th birthday together with her friends at a bar in Fullerton Hotel. After the stroke of midnight and end of the birthday party, Ng, her flatmate Ang Soo Hoon, and three of their friends went to Ng's condominium at West Coast Crescent to have drinks and play card games until 3.30am on 26 May, when the three friends left Ng's residence.

On 26 May 2011, the date of Ng's 36th birthday, Ng was last seen at her condominium at around 4am. She was missing for two days since, and thus, her flatmate Ang Soo Hoon, also known as ASH (the initials of her full name), reported her missing at the West Coast Neighbourhood Police Post. Ang, who worked as a derivatives dealer at United Overseas Bank, told the duty officer, Corporal (Cpl) Muhammad Nazri Parjali, that she found Ng not present in her condominium when she woke up at 10am on the day she went missing. Ang said that she was alone with Ng hours before that, after their three friends went back home, and as the both of them continued to drink, Ang heard from Ng that she wanted to go for a short trip overseas but she refused Ang's offer to travel with her, and Ng "looked preoccupied", since Ang witnessed Ng feeling disappointed and had an outburst due to her call to a former girlfriend went unanswered. Ang said that she felt sleepy after that and she went back to bed in her own bedroom, and by the time she woke up, Ang found that Ng was missing, and her passport, some clothes and bag were also gone, and her calls to Ng went unanswered. Ang told the police that she helped to collect from Ng's mother some noodles and a red packet meant for her daughter, but she initially did not tell Ng's mother about Ng's disappearance to not make her worry. However, Ang failed to contact or locate Ng after several attempts, and after discussions with Ng's friends (who all similarly could not find Ng), Ang accompanied Ng's brother and mother to make the police report.

The police classified the case of Ng as a missing persons case. They also interviewed Ng's friends and family members, who all described her as a cheerful and jovial person, and they did not notice anything amiss from Ng's behaviour, and none of them heard about Ng's purported plan to go overseas. In June 2011, Ng's family and friends also publicized Ng's case on the local newspaper The New Paper, appealing for the public to offer them information to locate Ng. In an interview, Ng's flatmate Ang told the press that there was no reason for Ng to disappear, since she just bought her condominium six months before and loved her car, dog and family.

== Discovery of Ng's skeleton ==
=== Nationwide search and discovery ===
After investigating for more than a month, the police were still unable to locate any clues on Ng's whereabouts, and their efforts drew a blank after nationwide searches in places like hospitals, prisons or institutions. The Immigration and Checkpoints Authority (ICA) also confirmed that Ng did not leave the country based on their records of people going in and out of Singapore. The police therefore suspected that something untoward might have happened to Ng, and assuming that Ng was possibly dead, the police conducted a nationwide search around the forested areas of Singapore, including forested areas nearby the National University of Singapore (NUS), West Coast Park and Kent Ridge Park, for possible human remains as part of their investigations.

After a search around Singapore from 29 June to 5 July 2011, the police turned their attention to Clementi Woods Park, where a team of officers discovered a complete set of a human skeleton hidden in the undergrowth, and despite a post-mortem examination by Dr George Paul, a forensic pathologist, he was unable to determine the cause of death and he speculated that the death of Ng might have occurred at least 41 days before, and the police also conducted forensic tests to identify the skeleton. When Celine Ng's family and friends received word of the finding, they feared the worst but they hoped that the skeleton did not belong to Ng. After a forensic dentist extracted a tooth from the deceased, and sent it for a DNA test, which was expected to take at least two or three weeks for a result to come out. Three days later, on 11 July 2011, the DNA profile of the tooth was found to be a match with the DNA profile of Celine Ng Swee Peng, after it was compared with the DNA profile lifted from Ng's comb. The confirmation brought much sadness to her loved ones and friends, who spent nearly two months to search for her. Ng's flatmate Ang Soo Hoon also spoke to reporters that she moved out of the flat to avoid from recalling with sadness the memories she had with Ng, with whom she had a long-term friendship.

=== Murder investigation and Ang's arrest ===
After confirming that the skeleton belonged to the missing Celine Ng, the police re-classified her case as one of unnatural death, and began to look through a list of possible suspects, and they also returned to Ng's condominium to collect potential sources of evidence. After narrowing down their list, the police focused their attention on Ang Soo Hoon, Ng's flatmate who first made the report and the sole witness who claimed that Ng was preoccupied and moody before the disappearance, as well as the closest to Ng out of her friends. Ang was reportedly suspected as she was the last person together with Ng before the latter went missing, and she had the opportunity to dispose of the body should Ang was responsible for the death of Ng, and none of Ng's other friends were suspected, as only one of them was Ng's former girlfriend and was overseas at the time, while the rest did not have a relationship with Ng and their car was not captured returning to the condominium after they left, and none of them were aware of Ng's supposed plan to go overseas except for Ang.

Ang was therefore brought in for questioning over the death of Ng, after the police located her at East Coast Park. About 40 minutes after the start of questioning, Ang broke down before she regained her composure, and confessed that she had killed Ng. With this confession, Ang was placed under arrest for the alleged murder of Ng.

On 13 July 2011, 36-year-old Ang Soo Hoon was officially charged with the murder of Celine Ng Swee Peng, close to two months after Ng was reported missing. Veteran criminal lawyer Subhas Anandan was engaged to defend Ang during her upcoming murder trial. About 30 of Ng's friends showed up in the courtroom to watch the proceedings when Ang was first charged for the murder; Ang was reportedly red-eyed due to crying and lowered her head to not face the public gallery as she faced the charge sheet in court. Under the Singaporean Penal Code, an offence of murder carried the death penalty under Section 302 of the Penal Code, and Ang would possibly be hanged if she was found guilty of murder.

On 20 July 2011, Ang returned to court a second time, and was ordered to be further remanded for another week to assist in investigations. Ng's friends were also present in the courtroom. It was also suspected that more than one person could be involved in the murder, as another one of Ng's friends was uncontactable and thus classified as a suspect, although it ultimately came down to the conclusion that Ng's death was the work of a lone killer. Many friends of Ang and Ng described Ang as a mild-mannered and soft-spoken woman who could not bear to hurt even an ant, and people (including the neighbours) often mistook Ang as a man due to her boyish-looking features and bespectacled looks.

As of 15 July 2011, Ng's skeleton was still at the mortuary and not returned to the family. Eventually, on 30 July 2011, the skeletal remains of Ng were finally returned to her loved ones for funeral preparations. About 50 of Ng's loved ones and friends attended the funeral on 1 August 2011, and it was reported that Ang Soo Hoon's younger brother also went to the funeral to offer condolences to Ng.

== Ang Soo Hoon's confession ==
=== Murder of Celine Ng ===
Ang Soo Hoon
- Born: Ang Soo Hoon; 1975 (age 50–51); Singapore
- Other name: ASH
- Occupation: Derivatives dealer (former)
- Status: Released since 2024
- Motive: Out of anger caused by alleged provocation
- Convictions: Manslaughter (one count); Providing false information to the police (one count); Misappropriating the belongings of a dead person (one count)
- Criminal charges: Murder (one count); Providing false information to the police (one count); Misappropriating the belongings of a dead person (one count)
- Penalty: 12 years and six months' imprisonment

After her arrest, Ang Soo Hoon confessed to the murder of Celine Ng Swee Peng, and the following was Ang's version of events that took place on 26 May 2011, as recorded in her confession dated 12 July 2011.

Background information revealed that Ang, who first befriended Ng in 1995 while they were at Ngee Ann Polytechnic together, had known Ng for 16 years and they regarded each other as close friends. Ang, who was homosexual like Ng, briefly had an intimate relationship with Ng in 2010, while they lived together in Balestier Road. Although the couple broke up, their friendship remained strong and Ng herself would went on to date another woman. Ang and Ng continued to live together after Ng bought a new unit at West Coast Condominium. In 2009, both Ng and Ang, and a third friend established a cafe, although it was sold off in the end due to their respective commitments to other lines of work.

According to Ang, after they celebrated Ng's birthday at the Fullerton Hotel, Ang, Ng and their three friends returned to Ng's condominium for drinks until around 3.30am or 4am. After the friends left at 4am, Ang and Ng were left in the flat, and Ng tried calling a former girlfriend. Ang said that Ng became agitated when she did not get a reply despite the relationship having ended two years before, and Ang also heard Ng playing a Chinese song "Chuan Qi" (sang by Chinese singer Li Jian), which Ng would always listen to whenever she was upset. Ng was reportedly despondent that her former girlfriend was still going out with another woman, and Ang advised Ng to let go of her former girlfriend. Ang said that Ng asked her if she could help her to die, and Ang, who was reluctant, told her she did not know how, but Ang managed to stop Ng from lifting and bringing a dumbbell to her own head. Ng later asked Ang if she could use a pillow to smother her, but Ang, who placed a pillow onto her face and covered it, failed to smother Ng. Ng allegedly insulted her, berating Ang for being "useless" for her failure. This insult provoked Ang into losing her composure, and she angrily sling her arm around Ng's neck in an armlock and strangled her, while another arm was used to tighten the armlock. Ang continued holding on to Ng's neck with the armlock until she became exhausted, and according to Ang, it was then she checked and found that Ng had stopped breathing and fell motionless.

=== Disposal of Ng's body and facade ===
After the death of 36-year-old Celine Ng, Ang Soo Hoon, then 36 years old, decided to dispose of the body. To make it appear that Ng had gone on an overseas trip, Ang took her friend's passport, packed an overnight bag and threw it down a rubbish chute. Ang tried to lift the body but failed to, and Ang initially planned to use a trolley from Ng's car to carry the body, but she realized that people could see the body in the trolley, and changed her plan by attempting to stuff the body into a cardboard box, but could not fit the legs in. After the box tore, Ang took a S$1,000 from Ng's wardrobe and went to the National University Hospital to buy a wheelchair. Ang did so to avoid using her credit card or ATM and hence preventing the purchase from being traced. That evening, Ang tried to place Ng's body in the wheelchair, but her attempt failed, and so after having dinner, Ang tried again to place the body on the wheelchair and succeeded, and even put a pair of shoes on Ng's feet.

At 3am the next day, Ang brought the wheelchair and body down to the condominium's carpark and moved the body into the backseat of Ng's car, and used Ng's jacket to cover Ng's face. After this, Ang drove off in Ng's car, and she drove all around Singapore, including the West Coast area, the East Coast area and Changi, to search for a safe place to hide the body, but she aborted the search after arriving at Changi due to daybreak, out of fear that she might be seen. Ang went back to East Coast, where she fell asleep in a carpark until 10am, and she once again drove aimlessly, until she reached both the Tanah Merah area and Sentosa before returning to East Coast. Having failed to find a suitable location to dispose of the body, Ang returned to the condominium, and she left the body concealed in the car at the carpark while resting at Ng's unit. After she rested enough, Ang drove Ng's car to East Coast Park and later to Sentosa Cove before she returned to East Coast Park. By the time it gotten dark, Ang failed to locate a place to conceal the body, and just as she was driving back west, Ang spotted a forested area off Clementi Road past midnight and decided to dump the body there. The area was located at Clementi Woods Park, and Ang briefly took a break by having a drink of coffee at a nearby coffee shop. Afterwards, Ang returned to the park, and brought the body into one of the forested areas and left it there, and covered it with leaves and plants. As for the wheelchair, Ang dropped it off at an elder care home in Balestier.

After disposing of the body, Ang would continue to keep up the pretense that Ng was missing and not dead, by making fake phone calls to Ng's phone and keep contacting Ng's family and friends on the pretext of updating or receiving updates about Ng's status. and she even accompanied Ng's mother and brother to make the police report on that same night she disposed of Ng's body.

== Trial and sentencing of Ang ==
On 16 July 2015, four years after her arrest for the murder of Celine Ng, 40-year-old Ang Soo Hoon was finally put on trial for killing her flatmate. By then, the charge of murder against Ang was reduced to one of culpable homicide not amounting to murder, equivalent to manslaughter in the law of Singapore, and this allowed Ang to escape the death penalty for murdering Ng. A spokesperson of the Attorney-General's Chambers (AGC) told the media that the murder charge was reduced after carefully considering the facts of the case, although no exact reasons were given behind this decision. Ang, who pleaded guilty to the manslaughter charge, also faced lesser charges of providing false information to the police and dishonest misappropriation of property, which Ang also admitted to in her plea of guilt submitted before the trial judge Tay Yong Kwang of the High Court.

The prosecution, led by Deputy Public Prosecutor (DPP) David Khoo, pressed for a jail term of not less than 13 years. DPP Khoo highlighted to the court that the circumstances of the killing were based solely on Ang's account, and the cause of death could not be objectively ascertained due to lack of supporting evidence. DPP Khoo argued that one aggravating factor was the intentional omission by Ang regarding the truth of Ng's death and disappearance, and he also pointed out that Ang confessed to the killing only more than a month after it happened, which had caused any crucial evidence to disappear by the time the crime came to light and Ang had also "proceeded to weave an elaborate web of lies to cover up the offence". The prosecution also stated that Ang had taken the life of a woman who was in the prime time of her life, and Ng's family and friends also described Ng as a cheerful and jovial person who did not exhibit any suicidal tendencies.

On the other hand, the defence, led by the late Subhas Anandan's nephew Sunil Sudheesan, sought a sentence of around ten years' jail. Sudheesan, who took over the case after his uncle's death from heart failure in January 2015 (six months before Ang's sentencing), asked the trial court to show leniency to Ang, who was remorseful and still dearly missed her friend, and he stated that the killing of Ng was completely out of character in Ang's case, as she was usually a "non-violent and meek" person. Arguing that the killing was unpremeditated and Ang had fully cooperated with the police after her capture, Sudhessan also brought forward testimonials written by Ang's younger brother and father, as well as Ang's colleagues and friends (including Ang's partner), to support Ang's description as a "caring, kind and gentle person". A psychiatric report found no signs of a mental abnormality from Ang's condition, and it was stated that Ang may have acted under the influence of alcohol but still retained the understanding of her actions.

After receiving the submissions from both sides, Justice Tay Yong Kwang delivered his decision, sentencing 40-year-old Ang Soo Hoon to 12 1/2 years' imprisonment, and backdate the jail term to the date of Ang's arrest. There were no official reasons given behind the decision on Ang's sentence.

== Aftermath ==
In July 2011, after the occurrence of the Celine Ng murder case and the discovery of a total of eight skeletons within that month in the city-state itself, there were circulations in social media claiming that there was a serial killer on the loose in Singapore, and these rumours were debunked by the police, and a police spokesperson stated that the claims of a serial killer were not true, and it was reported that out of the eight cases mentioned, only one of them, which was the case of Ng, was classified as murder, and none of these cases were related to each other. As of August 2011, there were eight murders here in the first six months of the year, and in light of Ng's case and several other killings, many Singaporeans were alarmed over the increasing rate of murders that happened during that year despite the extremely low crime rate and low murder rate in Singapore.

With the truth of Ng's fate coming to light, members of the public were shocked to find out that Ang, who was the most prominent in seeking the whereabouts of her friend, was the killer behind the case, given that she had actively helped in the efforts to search for Ng, which turned out to be a ruse to hide her tracks for those 47 days before her arrest. Some compared Ang's behaviour to that of notorious wife-killer Anthony Ler, who was said to have pretended to mourn for his wife at the funeral and accepted interviews when he in fact manipulated and solicited a minor to murder his wife Annie Leong in 2001, and this was before his treachery was exposed to the public through investigations. Ler was since convicted and hanged at age 35 in 2002 for abetting the murder of Leong, while the 15-year-old hired killer was detained for 17 years at the President's Pleasure before his release in 2018, since the death penalty was prohibited for offenders under 18 years old at the time of any capital offence committed.

In December 2011, the murder case, which shocked the nation, was listed as one of the most significant topics reported in the media nationwide. By end-2015, the case of Ang Soo Hoon was reported as one of the top ten topics to make headlines nationwide in July 2015. Additionally, in January 2014, it was reported that due to the Celine Ng case, there were increased measures for security in condominiums to prevent crime from happening and maintain the safety of the residents.

In June 2022, 11 years after the killing of Celine Ng, a local writer Foo Siang Luen wrote a real-life crime book titled Justice Is Done 2, which recorded some of Singapore's high-profile murder cases solved by police throughout the years between 2005 and 2016, and the 2011 case of Celine Ng's disappearance and death was one of these cases covered in the book. In the chapter titled Missing, which covered the Celine Ng case, Ang was described by the author as someone who was not a "hardened criminal" and had never committed any minor offences prior to the case, and yet something inside Ang snapped and it caused her to kill her best friend and ex-girlfriend over an offensive remark, classifying Ng's death as a "crime of passion committed in a moment of madness".

== See also ==
- List of major crimes in Singapore
- List of solved missing person cases (post-2000)
