= Masjid Tentera Diraja =

Mosque located in Clementi, Singapore

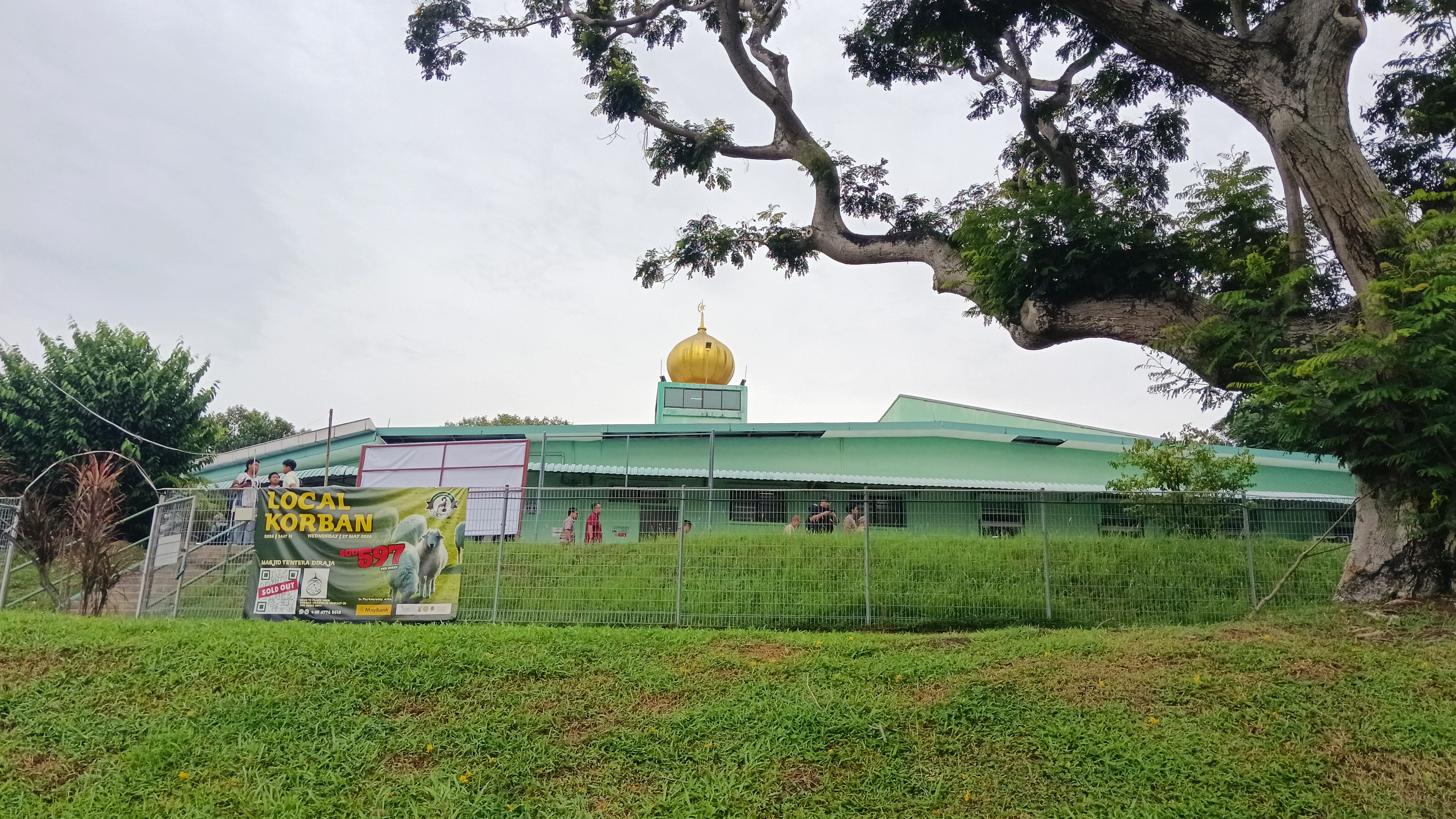

- Location in Singapore

Religion
- Affiliation: Sunni Islam

Location
- Location: 81 Clementi Road, Singapore 129797
- Country: Singapore
- Coordinates: 1.2986694°N 103.7692031°E

Architecture
- Type: Mosque
- Style: Modern architecture
- Completed: 1961

Specifications
- Dome: 1
- Minaret: 1

Masjid Tentera Dīrāja (Jawi: مسجد تنترا ديراجا; Tamil: তেতেরা দিরজা মসজিদ) is a mosque located in the Clementi Woods Park within Clementi, Singapore. It was built in 1961 by Muslims serving in the army of colonial Singapore, hence the name Tentera Diraja ("Army of the King" in Malay).

== History ==
Masjid Tentera Diraja was built in 1961 by Muslim soldiers who served in the colonial army. The mosque was officially inaugurated on 30 March 1962 by the then Prime Minister, Yusof Ishak, who led the grand inauguration ceremony at the mosque. A new committee for the mosque was formed upon its reopening as the old committee had been disbanded following British withdrawal from Singapore. After the completion of Masjid Darussalam, the existence of a second mosque in Clementi was seen as redundant by the authorities, resulting in the mosque being planned either to be converted into a madrasah, or to be demolished. These plans did not come to fruition as the government chose to preserve the mosque instead, but place it on Temporary Occupation License (TOL) land, hence the mosque may be demolished and the land returned to the government once the license had expired. The licence for the mosque was renewed in 2014, along with those of Masjid Petempatan Melayu Sembawang and Masjid Ahmad Ibrahim, allowing a longer lease period for all three mosques. The mosque also received a major renovation in 2006 which added a two-storey madrasah building annexed to the main mosque building.

== Gallery ==
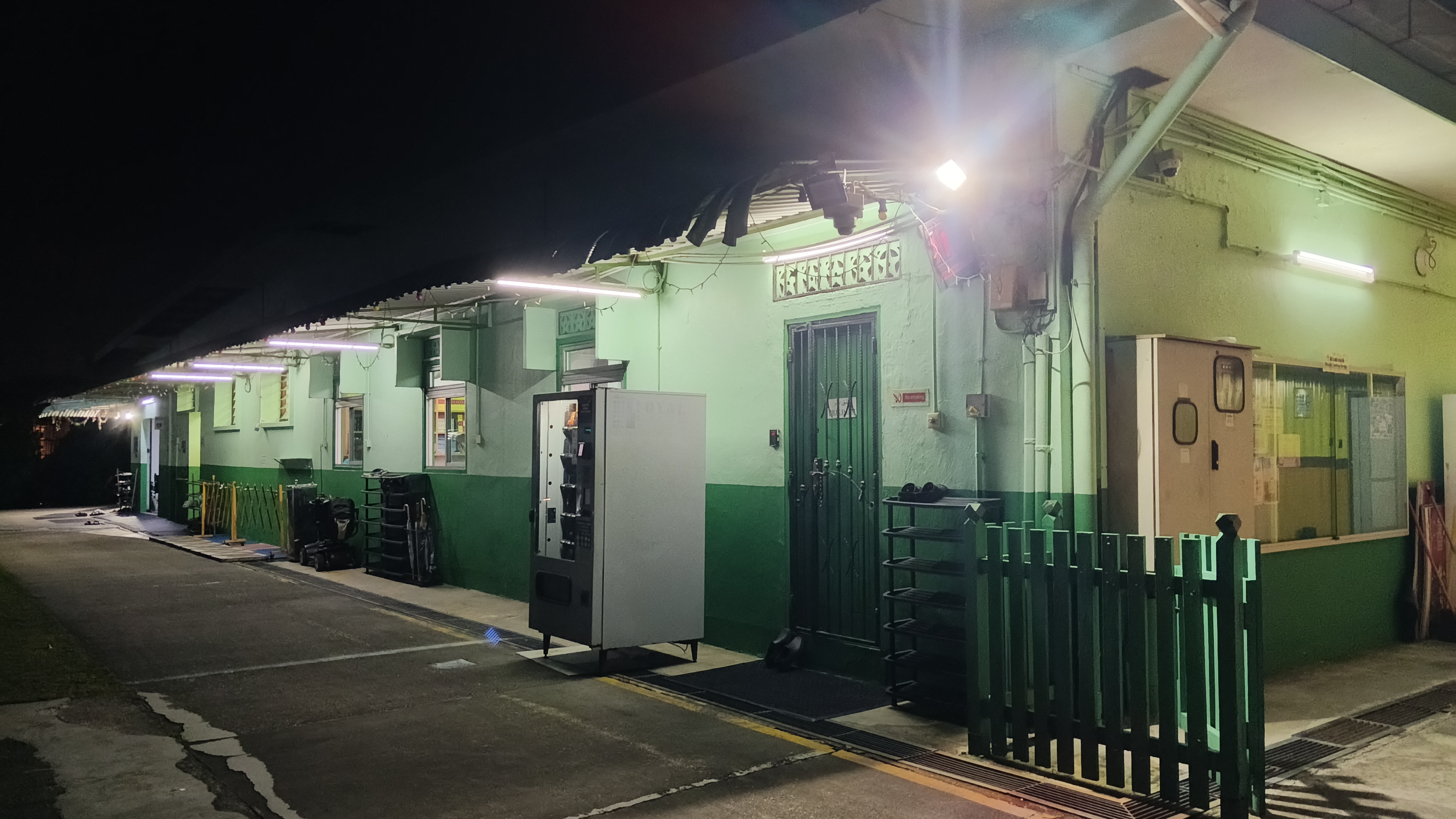
Southeastern view of the mosque, the Imam's room and windows into the main prayer hall visible.

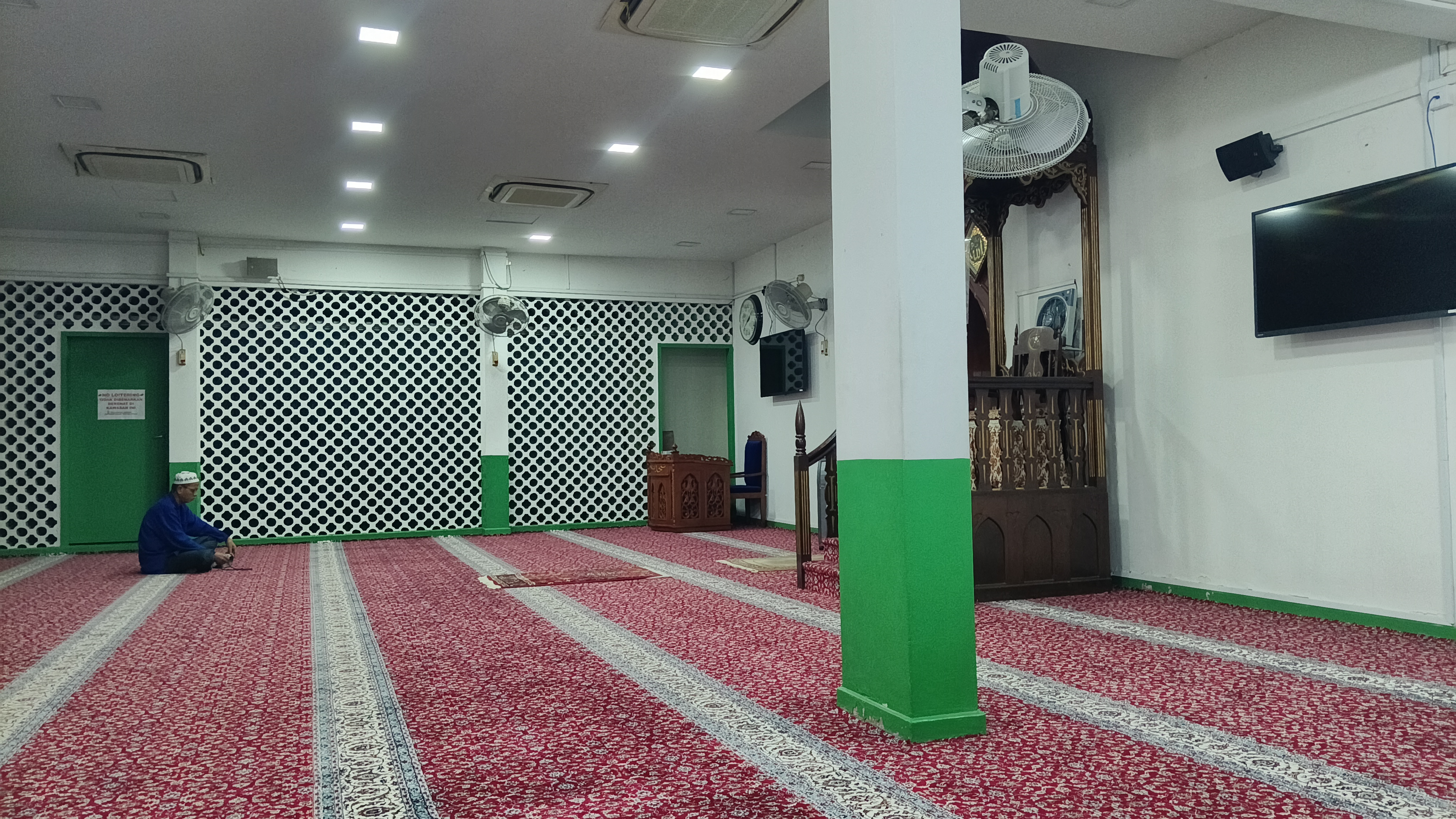
Main prayer hall of the mosque.

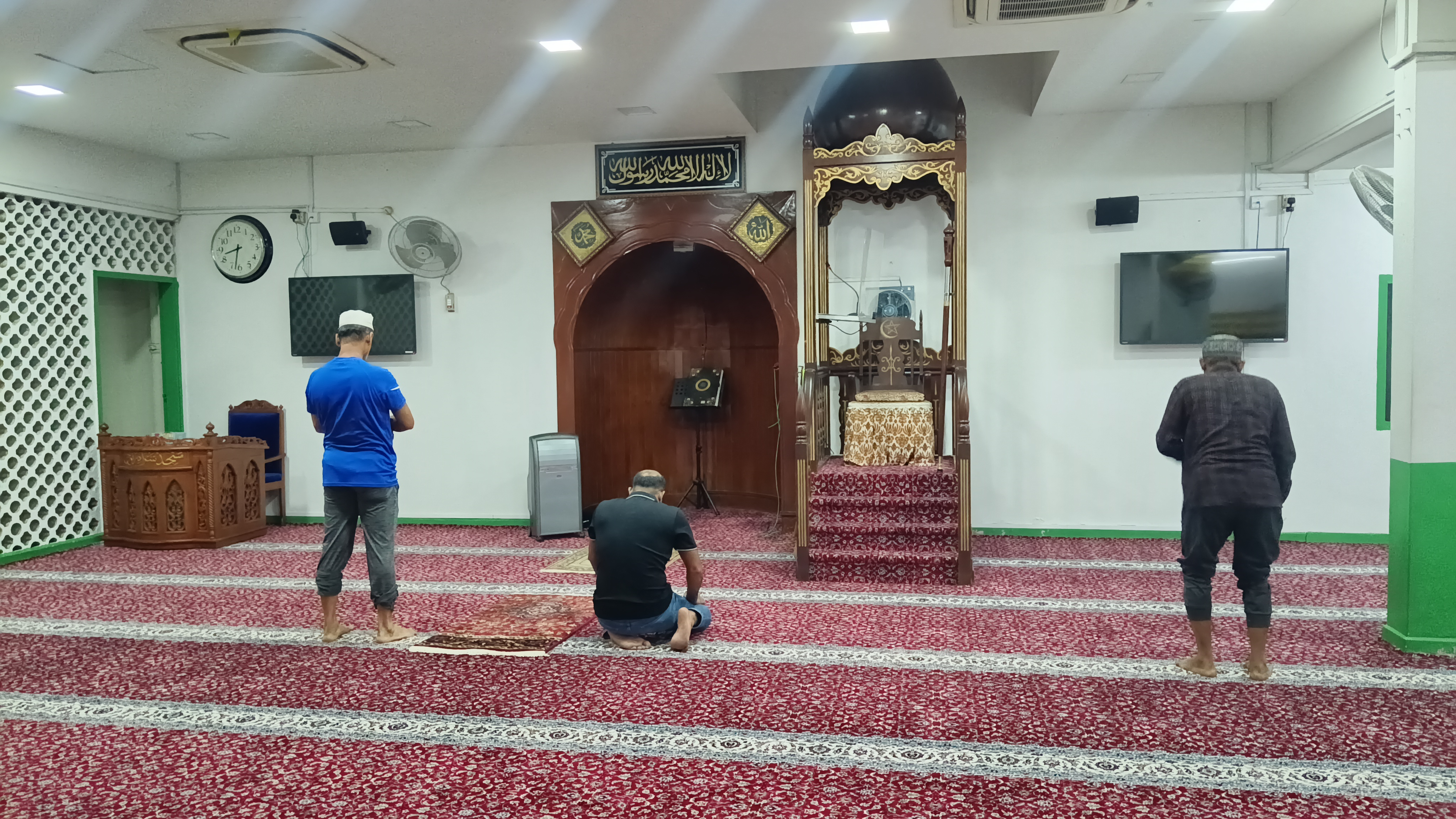
Worshippers in the main prayer hall.

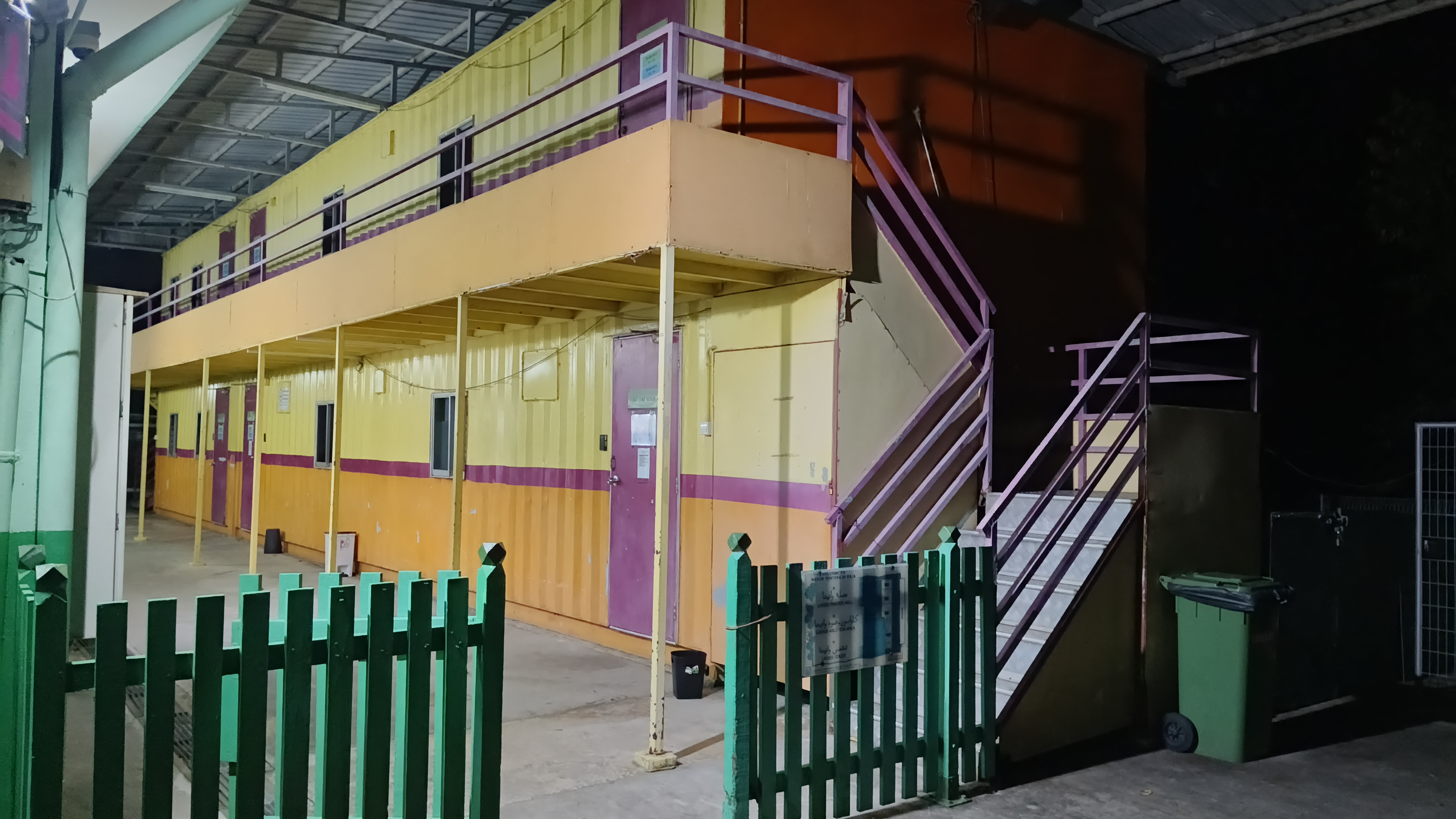
The madrasah building, which is two storeys high.

== Transportation ==
Masjid Tentera Diraja is located on a hill on the edge of the Clementi Woods Park.

== See also ==
- List of mosques in Singapore
