= Ang Chee Sia Ong Temple =

Chinese Temple

Ang Chee Sia Ong
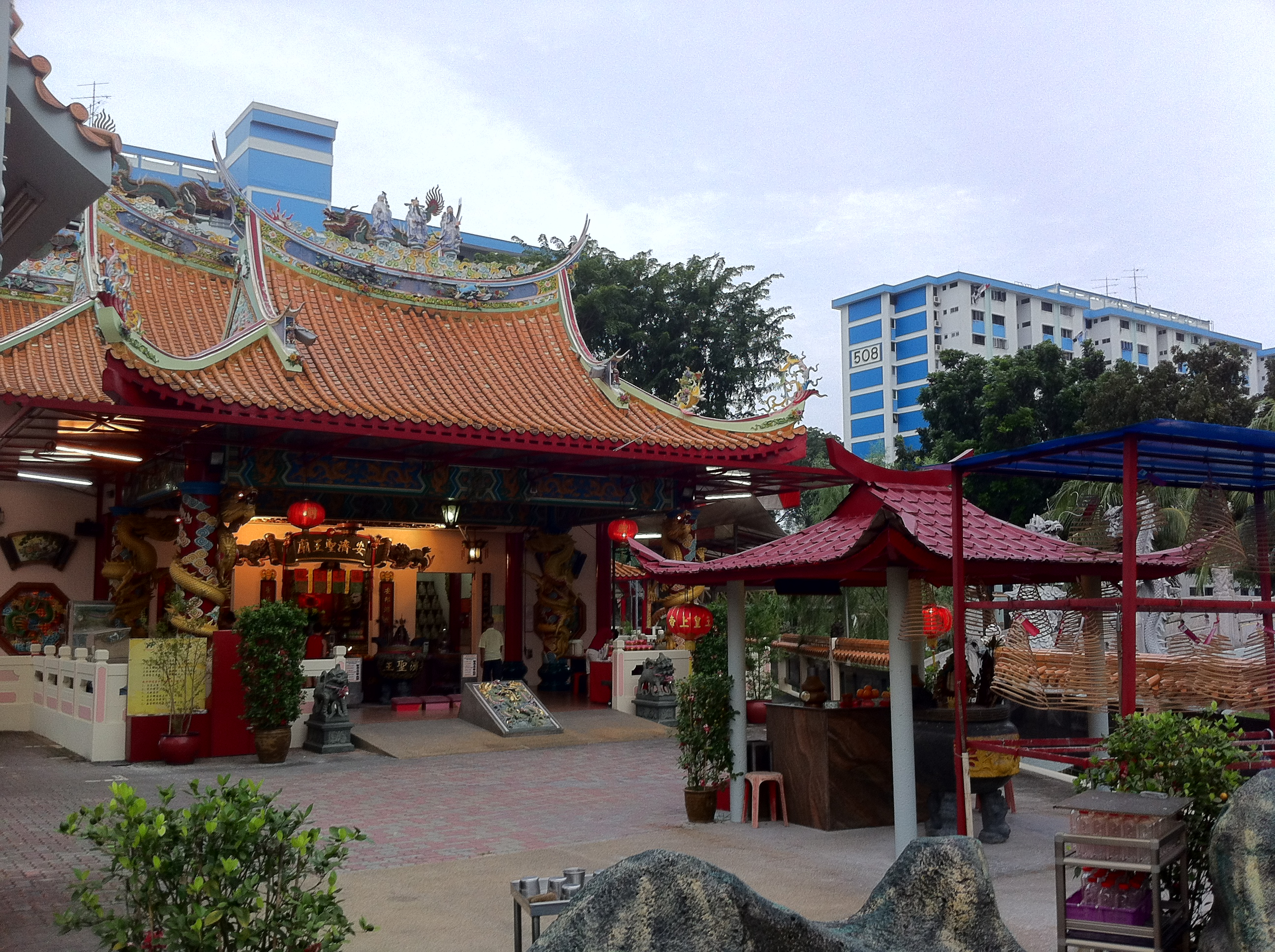
- Ang Chee Sia Ong Temple main hall

- Location within Singapore

Religion
- Affiliation: Taoism, Mahayana Buddhism and Confucianism
- Year consecrated: 1997

Location
- Location: 131 West Coast Drive, Singapore 128014
- Country: Singapore
- Coordinates: 1°18′41.28″N 103°45′37.66″E

Architecture
- Completed: 1997; 29 years ago

Ang Chee Sia Ong Temple (Chinese: 安濟聖王廟) is a Chinese temple affiliated to Taoism, Chinese Buddhism and Confucianism, it is located in West Coast, Singapore. The main hall is dedicated to the Lord Green Dragon (Chinese: 青龍爺), also known as Ang Chee Sia Ong (Chinese: 安濟聖王).

The temple was established in 1918 when the incense ashes (Chinese: 香火) of the original Green Dragon Temple at Han River, Chaozhou, Guangdong, China was brought over to Singapore by Wang Dong Qing and worshipped at his home.

In 1930, a temple was established at Pasir Panjang's 7th Milestone for public worship to Ang Chee Sia Ong. The temple land was later slated for redevelopment and the temple moved to West Coast Drive. The temple was formally consecrated in 1997.

== Background ==
Lord Green Dragon, aka Ang Chee Sia Ong and Anji Shengwang, is a highly representative local guardian deity in the Teochew people. His worship has spread widely to Southeast Asia (such as Singapore and Thailand) and around the world with the footsteps of Teochew immigrants.

== Gallery ==
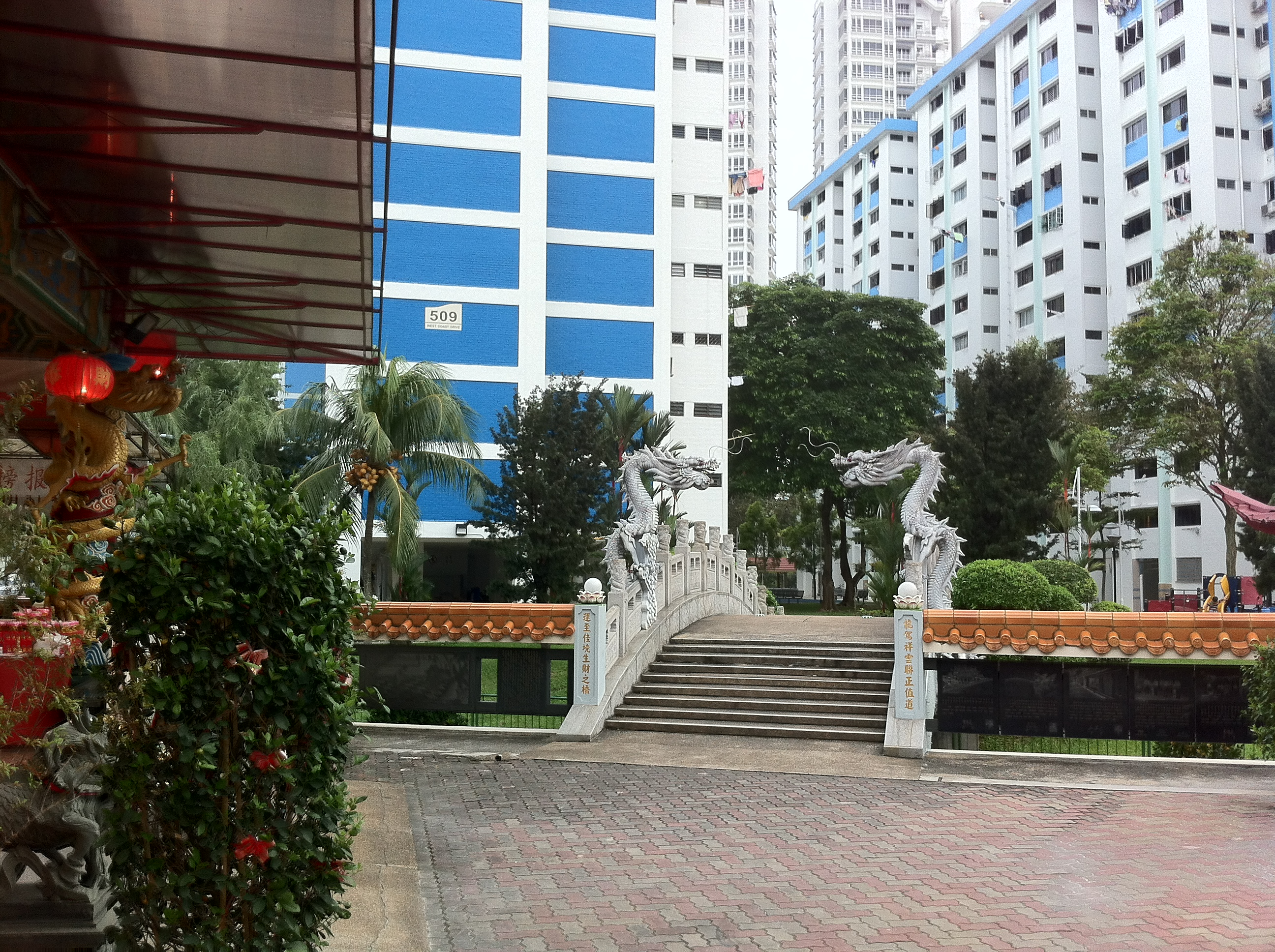
Bridge from the main hall to the HDB flats

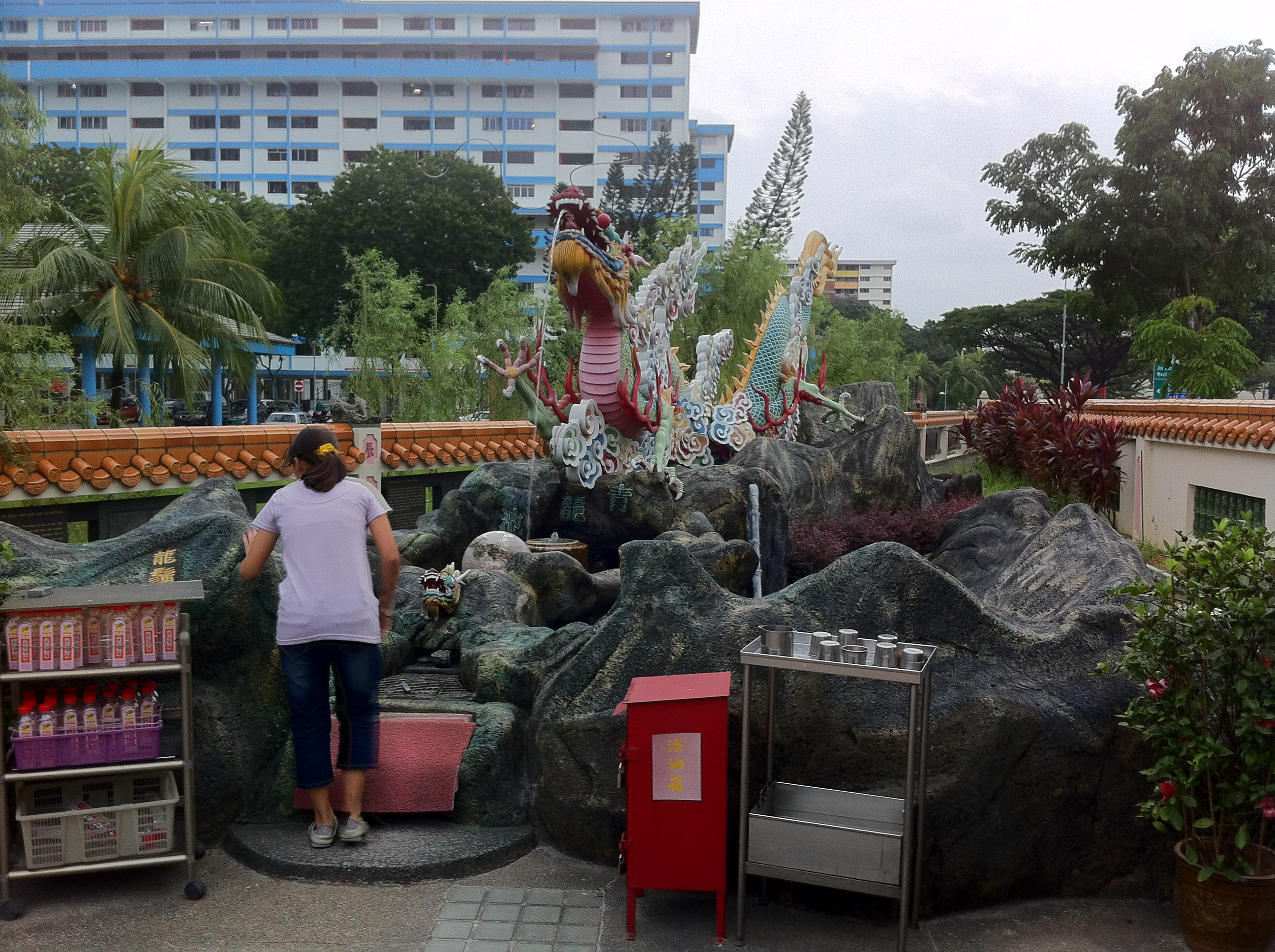
Colorful dragon in front of the main hall
