= Mark Phooi =

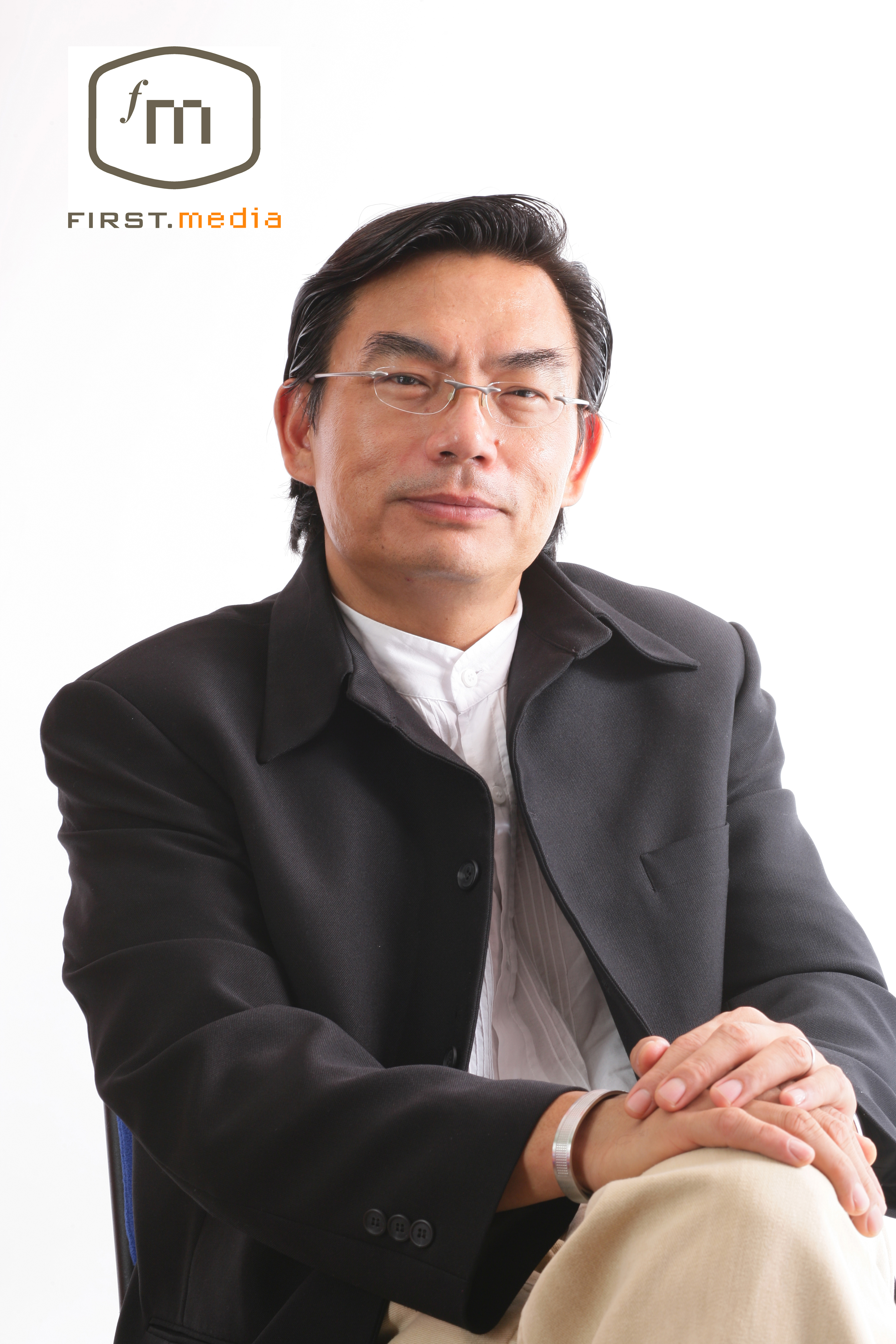
- Mark Phooi in April 2007

Mark Phooi Peck Lye is a Singaporean entrepreneur in the design industry. He is the founder and CEO of First Media Pte Ltd (FM), a holding company that manages a collection of design agencies and design institutions.

His first business venture at the age of 27 was a design agency he started on his own with a capital of S$2,000. He called it Lancer Design, deriving the name Lancer from the word "freelancer".

In 2006, Phooi founded First Media Design School (FMDS), a progressive private educational institution specialising in the field of design. In August 2011, FMDS was awarded the Council for Private Education's (CPE) four-year EduTrust mark.

== Early life and education ==
Phooi was born in Singapore. His father worked as a contractor for PSA International and his mother was a contract labourer. At the age of 9, he joined The Singapore Scout Association(SSA) as a Sea Scout and at the age of 12, he became a qualified lifeguard.

Phooi attended his secondary school education at Tanglin Secondary School. At the age of 24, he enrolled into a Fine Arts diploma program at the Nanyang Academy of Fine Arts(NAFA), but switched to a Graphic Design pathway soon after. He graduated from NAFA in 1989 at the age of 27. In 2002, he graduated from the University of New South Wales with a Master of Design.

== Career ==
=== Lifeguard and swimming coach ===
Phooi worked for a year as a lifeguard at Big Splash, a water theme park in Singapore that was launched in 1976. During this period, he also taught swimming to a handful of students, aged between 6 and 10 years old, on a part-time basis. While serving his National Service in Singapore, Phooi continued to coach swimming during the weekends to supplement his income. After completing his National Service, he started to teach on a full-time basis.

Midway through his coaching career, Phooi embarked on a training program to attain the CLASS 1 Swimming Coach qualification. As part this program, he was attached to the People's Association swimming team, under the tutelage of the Kee Soon Bee, a prolific national swimming coach.

Phooi stopped coaching swimming at the age of 29.

=== Designpreneur ===
Phooi began his career as a designpreneur (entrepreneur in the design industry) by setting up Lancer Design in 1989. Phooi ran the company on his own without any staff.

In 2002, Phooi established First Media Pte Ltd (FM) as a holding company for his design firms and design schools. His design agencies specialised in various design and media disciplines, such as corporate design, interactive media, events, publishing and advertising and promotion. Companies under the First Media brand include Lancer Design and Mint Editions in Singapore, Brand Smart in China, Auromedia, Discover Jakarta and Imago in Indonesia, BnBc Advertising Sdn Bhd and BnBc Events and Promotions Sdn Bhd in Malaysia, Clever Brand Strategy Co. Ltd in Taiwan, and P.0.P. House in Thailand.

In 2005, FM received the Enterprise 50 Award – an annual business award recognising Singapore's most promising privately held companies.

In 2006, Phooi was awarded one of the Top Entrepreneurs of the Year Awards (organised by the Association of Small and Medium Enterprises and the Rotary Club of Singapore) – one of the highest business award recognitions in Singapore, and one that no trained designer had ever attained previously.

In 2007, Phooi was also selected as one of the finalists in Singapore's top design accolade – the President's Design Award.

=== Education ===
In 2006, Phooi founded First Media Design School (FMDS), a boutique private design institution that offers diploma, advanced diploma and degree programs in the areas Graphic design, Multimedia and Fashion design. Its Bachelor's degree program is conferred by the University of the West of England(UWE).

The institution's mission statement specifies that FMDS strives to cultivate a new generation of 'whole brain' trained, industry-ready designers who possess both creative and commercial cognitive abilities, through its holistic design thinking and design management teaching system. Its teaching methodology is partly derived from the Herrmann Brain Dominance Instrument system.

The students enrolled in FMDS consist of a mixture of local and international students, mostly from Indonesia and China. FMDS equips career starters and career switchers with the necessary skills to go from mere practitioner to business-owner. In an interview in 2006, when Phooi was asked about how he envisions FMDS to be different from other design schools in Singapore, he said:

We will differentiate ourselves by developing designers to become design managers. This is what is lacking in the industry today. There are many designers but not enough creative managers. We have thousands of graduates every year with few job opportunities. Not only will we create enterprising graduates, but we will also offer them jobs in our companies.

=== Contribution to Golf ===
Phooi has been involved in the governance and administration of Warren Golf & Country Club (Warren), contributing to the development of the club's management, performance and strategic planning systems. An avid golfer, Phooi stepped up to serve as Honorary Secretary of Warren in 2025 and, during the 2025–2027 term, concurrently chaired its Establishment Sub-Committee. In his capacity as Honorary Secretary, he has been responsible for the club's governance, records and communications, while also supporting wider initiatives aimed at strengthening its management and operational structures.

During the club's restructuring, Phooi played a pivotal role in supporting governance reform, General Manager oversight, department-wide KPI design, financial and pricing strategy, and member communications. Much of this work was developed or produced between December 2025 and August 2026, with a focus on introducing more systematic approaches to performance management, financial planning and operational accountability.

As part of this work, Phooi developed and proposed a number of management and performance frameworks for the club. These included an eight-dimensional framework for evaluating clubhouse investments and services, a comprehensive departmental KPI framework covering areas including golf, the golf course, finance, facilities and food and beverage, and a club-wide operational excellence framework. The golf component of the departmental KPI system included a structured revenue and utilisation model designed to translate the club's overall golf revenue targets into operational booking and member-versus-guest utilisation scenarios.

Phooi also played a role in strengthening management oversight at Warren. During his tenure, he was involved in the development of formal performance assessments for the club's General Manager, including a weighted scorecard covering financial recovery, operational continuity, strategic planning and leadership. A subsequent leadership evaluation framework and assessment addendum introduced a more structured approach to evaluating management performance and identifying areas requiring improvement.

His governance work extended to the structure of the club's elected Management Committee. In 2026, Phooi authored proposals to reduce the Management Committee from 11 positions to seven through the consolidation of portfolios and sub-committees. The proposal was accompanied by a financial analysis of the potential reduction in committee-related privileges and expenses, as well as a redefinition of responsibilities intended to improve accountability and decision-making.

Phooi has also contributed to the club's financial and membership strategy. His work included proposals concerning golfing transfer fees and term memberships, with the stated objective of balancing membership liquidity, secondary-market activity and the club's longer-term financial position ahead of its lease expiry in 2030. Taken together, Phooi's contribution to Warren during the 2025–2027 term has centred on the professionalisation and systematisation of club governance. His work sought to move areas such as management appraisal, departmental targets, investment decisions and membership pricing from informal practices towards measurable frameworks with defined responsibilities, performance indicators and financial thresholds.

=== Investments ===
As an entrepreneur, Mark Phooi has more than 30 years of experience in international real estate investment. His investment activities have included markets in New Zealand, Canada, the United States, the Philippines, Singapore, Malaysia, Thailand, Vietnam and Indonesia. In 2013, he established a family office, Apeiros Capital, to consolidate and manage his investment activities. Through Apeiros Capital, he has also invested in real estate in Japan.

== Bibliography ==
In 2013, Phooi co-authored Think like a Sage, Work like a Fool, Act like a Criminal (ISBN 978-981-07-5167-8), which consists of his biography, and a compilation of business theories, life lessons and personal reflections garnered from the early years of his career as a designpreneur to the present.
