= West Coast Plaza =

- Location: Singapore
- Coordinates: 1.3036°N 103.7642°E
- Address: 154 West Coast Road
- Opened: 1992; 34 years ago (Ginza Plaza); 2008; 18 years ago (West Coast Plaza)
- Closed: 2007; 19 years ago (Upgrading)
- Owner: Far East Organization
- Num. of stores: 68
- Floor area: 160,000 square feet (15,000 m^{2})
- Floors: 3 (including a ground floor)
- Website: www.westcoastplaza.com.sg

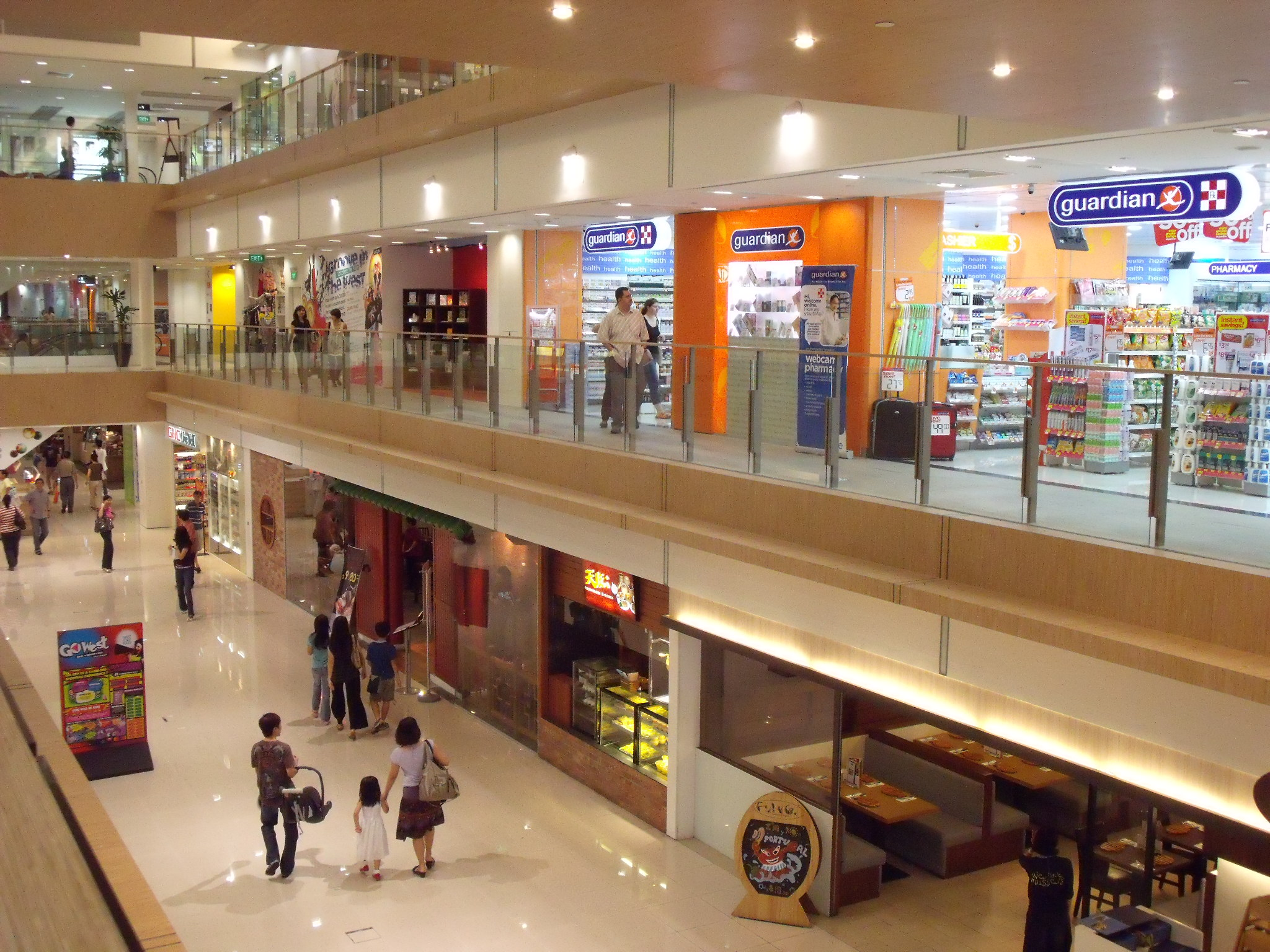
The renovated mall offers a wider selection of shopping

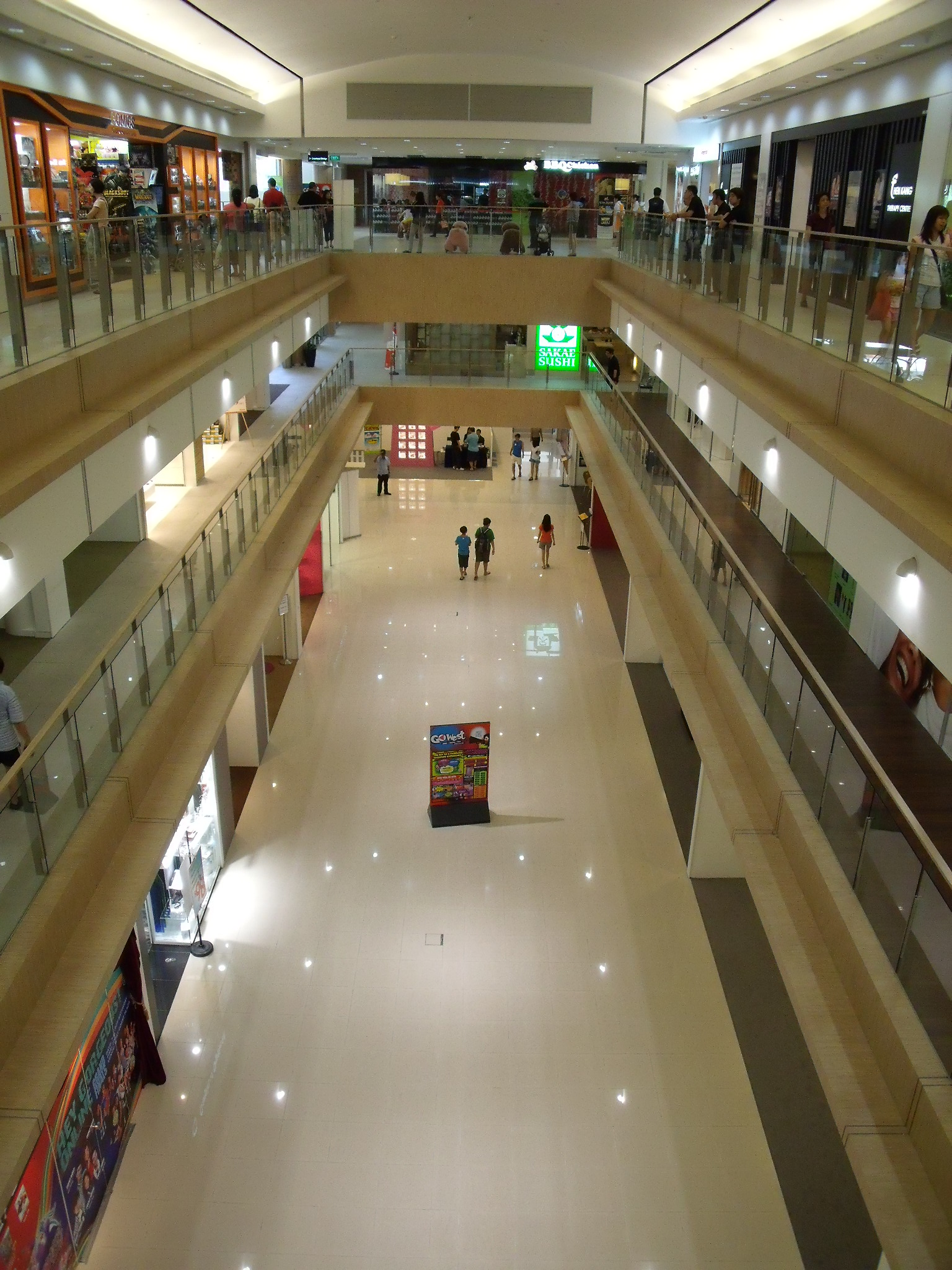
Three levels of shopping are available in the plaza

West Coast Plaza, formerly known as Ginza Plaza (Japanese: 銀座プラザ) is a mixed retail and residential development in West Coast, Singapore. The retail building is a 3-storey development totaling approximately 160,000 sq ft (15,000 m^{2}) of retail space.

== History ==
Named after Ginza, Tokyo, the original mall opened in 1992. It was the first of a group of heartland malls built in the 90s as part of a decentralisation plan for commercial activities, and the most important real estate event in the Clementi West area that decade.

== Overview ==
The 3-storey suburban mall has over 100 shops, including eateries, fashion, beauty and electronic shops, as well as children enrichment centres.

== Incidents ==
=== Ginza Plaza explosion ===
On 7 August 1992, an explosion occurred in Ginza Plaza. A gas pipe exploded and the fire at the basement level quickly spread out. The Singapore Civil Defence Force was quickly dispatched to extinguish the fire. In total, there were 61 casualties and 3 were found dead. As a result of this explosion, the completion date was delayed.

== Upgrading ==
In March 2007, Far East Plaza Organisation closed down the then Ginza Plaza for major upgrading. At a cost of S$26 million, the upgrading works were completed in November 2008 and the mall was renamed as West Coast Plaza.
