= New Town Secondary School =

Government secondary school in Singapore

New Town Secondary School 光伟中学
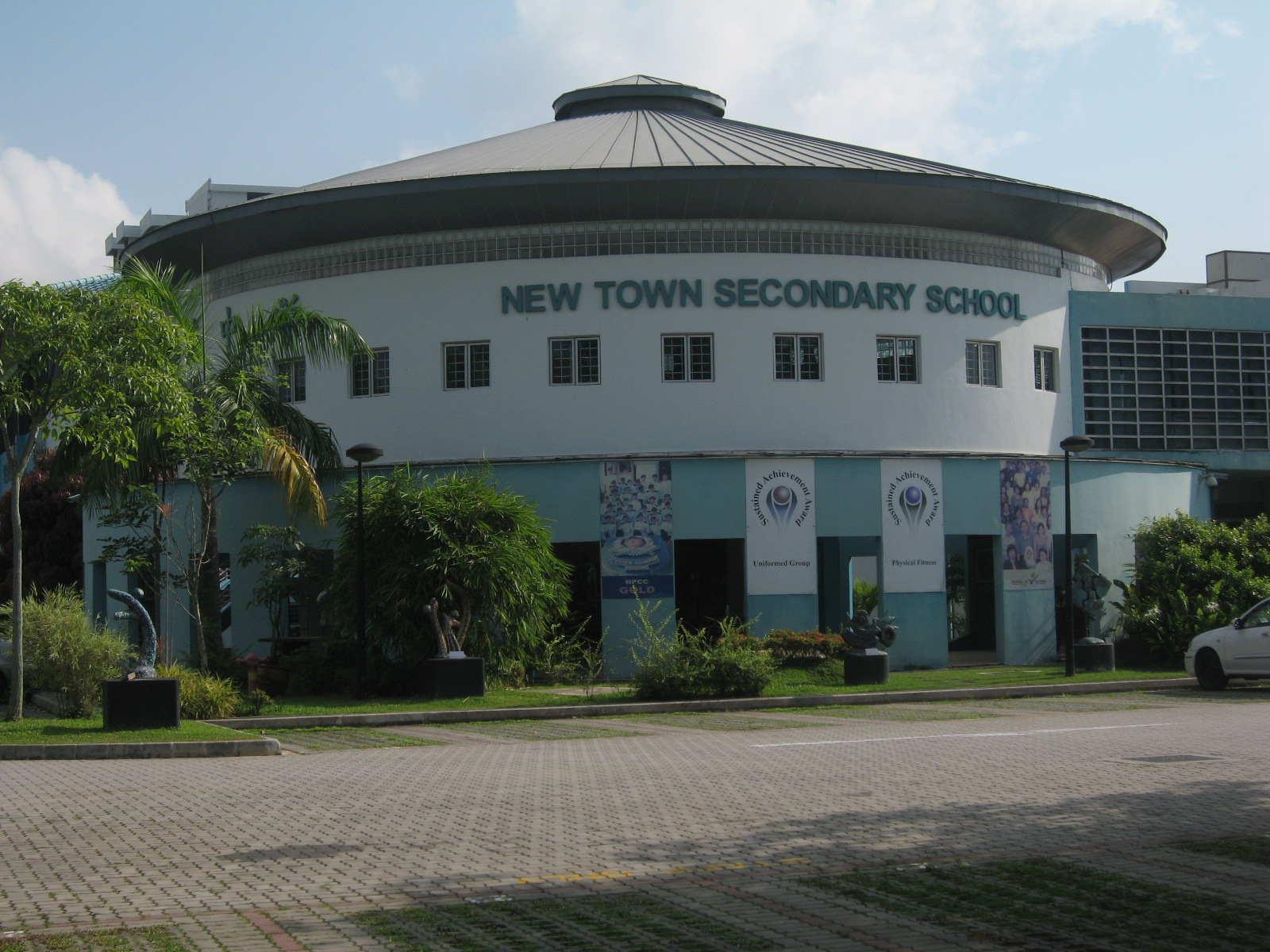

Location
- 1020 Dover Road; 139657; Singapore
- Coordinates: 1.3100°N 103.7732°E

Information
- Type: Government
- Motto: To Forge a Better Life
- Established: 1965
- Session: Single session
- School code: 3507
- Principal: Ari Manickam
- Enrolment: Approx. 1000 (as of 2020)
- Language: English, Mandarin, Malay, Tamil
- Colour: Blue White Black
- Website: www.newtownsec.moe.edu.sg

New Town Secondary School (NTSS) (simplified Chinese: 光伟中学; pinyin: Guāngwěi Zhōngxué) is a co-educational government secondary school located along Dover Road in Queenstown, Singapore. Established in 1965, it was the 68th Primary School to be opened by the Singapore Government, and the same year the Republic of Singapore gained its independence. Founding Prime Minister Mr Lee Kuan Yew visited the school on 25 May 1967.

== History ==
New Town Secondary School was initially in Queensway. At the start, it was known as Queensway's Third Secondary School (the other two being Queensway and Queenstown Secondary Schools), aimed at providing English education to the children of Queenstown residents. It was named New Town Secondary School in mid-1965. When the school first started, it had more than 1,800 students in 45 classes, across Secondary 1 to 4.

New Town Secondary School was officially opened on 17 September 1966 by Labour Minister Jek Yeun Thong.

In 1969, New Town Secondary School merged with the neighbouring Baharuddin Vocational School, doubling the size of its school compound and increasing its students intake to more than 3,000.

In 1974, a 400-metre bitumen athletic track was constructed.

In 1998, it moved to its current site at Dover Road. A tree was removed and shifted to the new Dover Road campus as part of the symbolic move.

In 2015, the school celebrated its 50th anniversary.

In 2021, the Ministry of Education announced that the school will be merged with Tanglin Secondary School in 2023.

In 2023, Tanglin Secondary School and New Town Secondary merged under the name NEW TOWN SECONDARY SCHOOL at New Town Secondary School’s campus. A new logo and uniform was designed following the merger.

== Co-curricular activities (CCAs) offered ==
Sports	Clubs & Societies	Visual & Performing art	Uniformed Group
Badminton; Basketball; Football (Boys)*; Softball (Girls)*; Table Tennis (Boys)*; Netball (Girls)*; Fencing	Infocomm Technology (Media Production)	Arts and Crafts; Concert Band; Contemporary Dance; Guzheng Ensemble	Girl Guides (Girls)*; National Cadet Corps (NCC) (Land) (Boys)*; National Police Cadet Corps (NPCC)

*A student must be of a specific gender to be able to join such CCAs

== Student Leaders ==
Currently in this school, there are Student Leaders such as the Student Councillors, Peer Support Leaders, CCA Leaders and Class Chairpersons. They are a part of the "Learning for Life Programme". Starting with mastery of self, every student will be given the opportunity to learn and apply leadership competencies through various learning experiences as part of their leadership journey in New Town Secondary School.

== Student Council Board ==
The Student Council Board represents the students' voice of the school. They model the way for the students in the school and are part of planning for school events such as Staff Appreciation Fiesta. There are different subcommittee: Student Advocacy, School Identity, Outreach & Partnership and Internal Relations.

== Peer Support Leader Board ==
The Peer Support Leader Board promotes students' wellbeing and encourages kindness. They plan events such as the Kampong Class Bingo (KCB) to foster a "Kampong Spirit" within the classes to build friendships and class unity. Similarly to the Student Council Board, there are different subcommittee: Class Cohesion, Cyber Wellness, Outreach & Partnership and Student Welfare.

== Notable alumni ==
- Teo Ho Pin, former member of parliament for Bukit Panjang SMC

== See also ==
- Education in Singapore
