= Tanglin Secondary School =

Government-aided secondary school in West Coast, Singapore

- 东林中学 (Chinese); Sekolah Menengah Tanglin (Malay)

Location
- 301 West Coast Road, Singapore 127391
- Coordinates: 1.309941°N 103.757828°E

Information
- Type: Government-aided; Co-educational
- Motto: Strive for Success
- Established: January 1964; 62 years ago
- Closed: January 2023; 3 years ago
- Session: Single
- School code: 3511
- Principal: Chong Jack Sheng
- Color: Yellow Grey
- Website: School Website

Tanglin Secondary School
- Traditional Chinese: 東林中學
- Simplified Chinese: 东林中学
Transcriptions
Standard Mandarin
- Hanyu Pinyin: Dōnglín Zhōngxué
Southern Min
- Hokkien POJ: Tang-lîm Tiong-o̍h

Tanglin Secondary School was a co-educational government secondary school in Clementi, Singapore.

== History ==
=== Tanglin Technical Secondary School (1964 - 1993) ===
Tanglin Secondary School which was located at 369 Commonwealth Avenue in the area called Tanglin Halt was officially opened by Education Minister Ong Pang Boon on 16 October 1964. It was Singapore’s first Chinese medium technical school, and the first institution to admit female students to technical courses. It was renamed Tanglin Technical Secondary School in 1969. The school motto was in Malay, “Berusaha Untok Berjaya”, of which translates to the same meaning as the current motto in English.

=== Tanglin Secondary School ===
It was switched later to the Chinese medium pre-university classes, and renamed Tanglin Secondary School and relocated to the current premises at 301 West Coast Road in 1993.

=== Merger of Clementi Woods Secondary School ===
In 2014, the Ministry of Education announced a merger of Clementi Woods Secondary School with Tanglin Secondary School, taking effect in 2016. The merged school retains the name and campus of Tanglin Secondary. The vision was updated to ‘Leaders of the Future, Pride of the Community’.

=== Merger into New Town Secondary School ===
In 2021, the Ministry of Education announced Tanglin Secondary School will be merged into New Town Secondary School in 2023.

The old school site will be the site of West Coast MRT station.

== Special Programmes ==
- Bias for Engineering (Niche)
- Bias for Arts (Niche)
- Multimedia Digital Science Enrichment
- Y2Y Entrepreneur Incubation Programmes
- School Family Education
- BASICS Character Education
- School Exchange and Twinning Programme
- Music Education Programme for Secondary 1 and 2
- Dance Education for Secondary 1 and 2 boys and girls
- Environmental Education Programme
- Advanced Elective/Elective Module Programme(AEM/EM)
- Applied Graded Subject (AGS)

== Notable alumni ==
- Cedric Foo: Member of Parliament
- Zainudin Nordin: Member of Parliament
- Mark Phooi: Entrepreneur
- Jayley Woo: Actress, Mediacorp
- Andie Chen: Actor, Mediacorp
- Sharil Ishak: Singapore Footballer
