= West Coast Park =

Park in Singapore

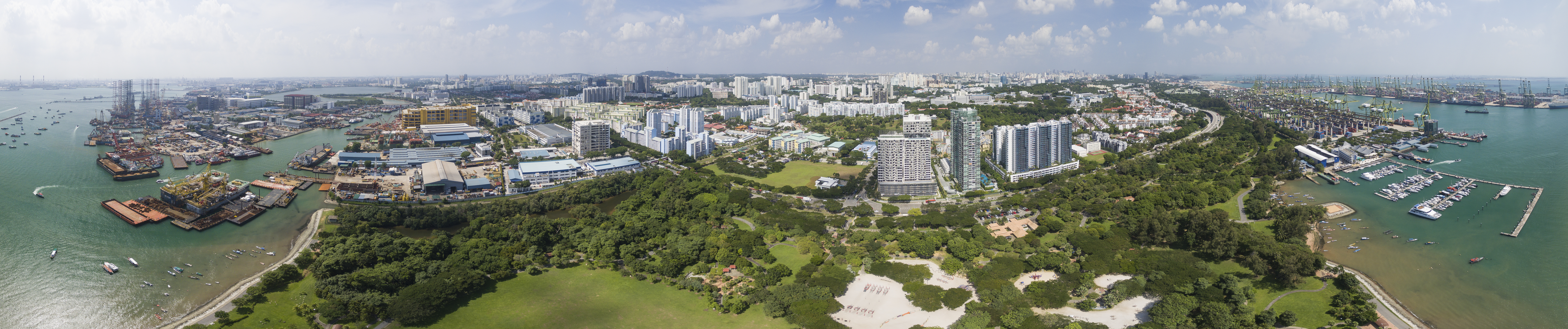
- Aerial panorama of West Coast Park
- Interactive map of West Coast Park
- Type: Regional
- Location: Queenstown
- Coordinates: 1.291°N 103.767°E
- Established: 1970s
- Manager: National Parks Board
- Status: Open to the public
- Public transit: Bus stop ID: 17291, 16241

West Coast Park is a large regional park located at the far west of Queenstown, Singapore. It runs parallel to West Coast Highway, and covers an area of roughly 50 hectares of park land consisting of three areas, each with its own variety of activities promising to ensure a fun-filled day for visitors both young and old. Since its inception, the park has been themed as the "Play Centre in the West".

== Description ==
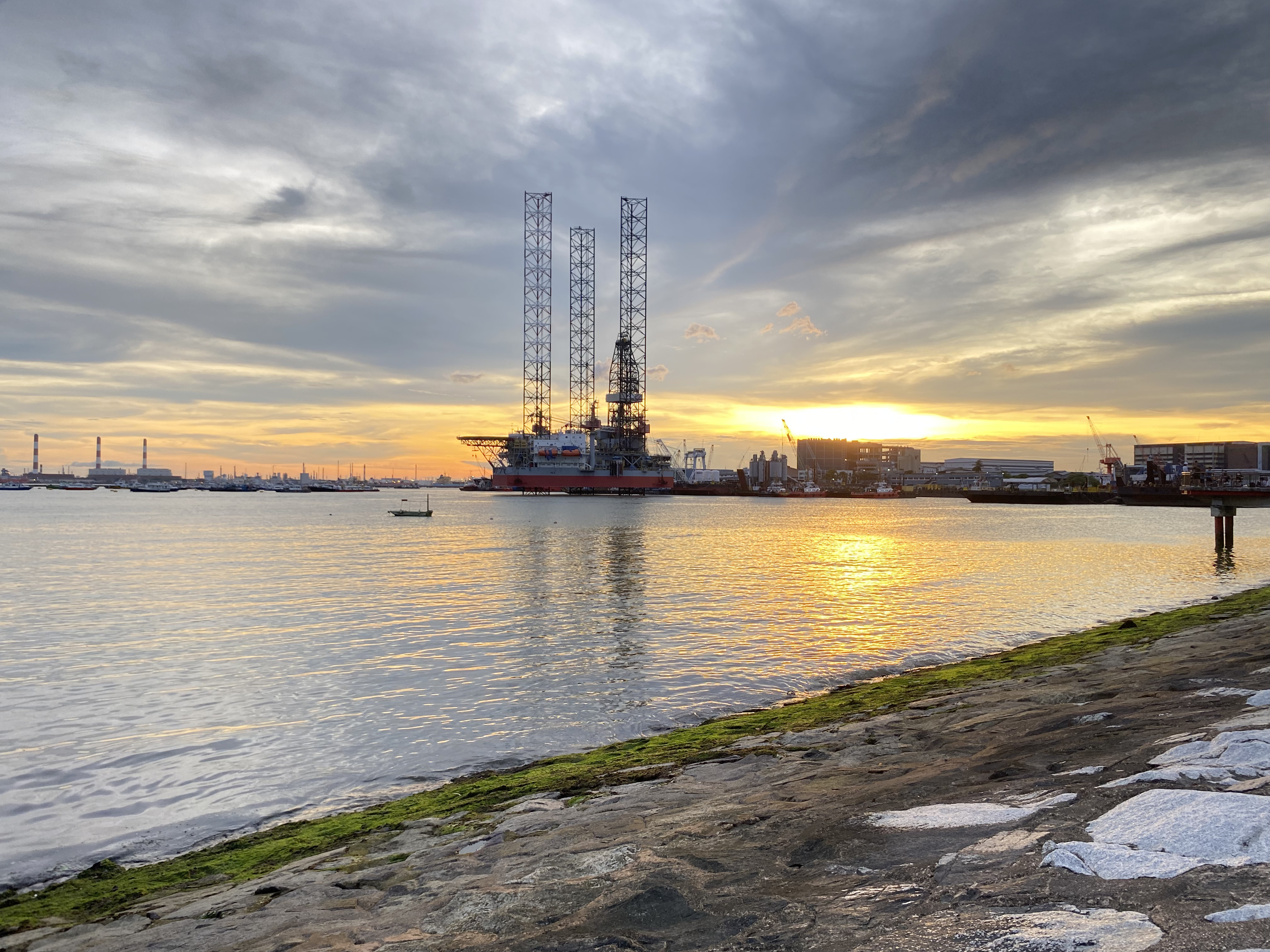
Coastal View of West Coast Park (2022)

Covering an area of 50 ha (120 acres), West Coast Park is bounded by West Coast Highway to the north, and by Harbour Drive and the Straits of Singapore to the south, and is divided into two parts by West Coast Ferry Road.

== History ==
First planned in the mid 1970s, the development of West Coast Park began in 1977. Constructed with the assistance of two Japanese experts and sited on reclaimed land in Pasir Panjang, the 21 ha (52 acres) park was envisioned as a smaller version of East Coast Park, and was to be developed in two phases. The first phase of development comprised a freshwater lake, open spaces, a playground, and an area for picnics and barbeques, while the second phase entailed the further development of the open spaces. In addition, a 40 ha (99 acres) park extension between West Coast Road and Pasir Panjang Road was developed by the early 1980s.

In the early 1980s, the Singapore Armed Forces Display and Singapore International Kite Festival were held at the park annually, but it was not seen as a desirable destination by the general public, which The Straits Times attributed to the park having little to offer. Subsequently, the Parks and Recreation Department announced plans to upgrade the park for over S$1 million in September 1984, proposing to add jogging and cycling facilities, along with benches and shelters with unique designs. The upgrading works, which also added a pond, flower beds and an open space for kite flying, were completed by 1986, and cost about S$5 million. In addition, a boat storage facility was proposed to house boats parked along the shore in the park, but plans were shelved in November 1985 due to reduced demand, with boat owners allowed to park their boats along a 1 km (0.62 mi) long section of the park instead. Subsequently, in response to complaints from the public regarding the presence of boaters' huts in the park, boat owners were ordered to move to Tuas by the Port Of Singapore Authority in June 1989. In July 1987, the Republic of Singapore Yacht Club announced plans to build a marina in the park, and plans to build a marsh garden at the park's western end were announced in September 1988. Comprising a 1.5 ha (3.7 acres) pond ringed by mud flats and wetland vegetation, and expected to cost S$300,000, the garden was intended to serve as a feeding and breeding spot for native and migratory birds.

Several facilities in the park were relocated to facilitate the construction of Pasir Panjang Terminal in the 1990s, while a section of the park was cleared to make way for an access road to the terminal. In addition, in 1995, the Parks and Recreation Department announced plans to redevelop the park after the completion of land reclamation works for Pasir Panjang Terminal. Intended to give the park a maritime theme, the redevelopment scheme entailed the addition of an observation tower designed after a lighthouse and a maritime walk. The park was closed for redevelopment in 1998, and reopened two years later upon the completion of the first phase of redevelopment. Costing S$8.3 million, this phase comprised the addition of a sand play area, barbeque pits, a marsh garden, and a 1.1 ha (2.7 acres) playground, Singapore's largest at the time. The Straits Times noted that the park's popularity increased after the revamp, while the second phase of redevelopment started in 2001.

== Community efforts ==
The Marsh Garden within the park has undergone a rejuvenation project, which was launched in conjunction with Earth Day 2008 on 22 April 2008. The 1-hectare garden was home to 15 species of birds and 10 species of plants. A collaboration with the public, private and people sectors, partners in this project include Shell Oil Company, National Parks Board (NParks), nature enthusiasts and residents in the South West district. A total of 200 new saplings was planted in phases to rejuvenate the biodiversity of the mangrove habitat.

== Facilities ==
The park includes barbeque pits, a campsite, and a marsh garden, along with a McDonald's restaurant, a dog run, and a bicycle obstacle course.

=== Grand Lawn ===
The 3.5-hectare (8.65 acres) Grand Lawn can support spaces for picnics, frisbee-playing and carnivals. It is also a common spot for kite-flying. As noted by the National Parks, the Grand Lawn is one of the biggest lawns in Singapore, with an excellent sea view.

=== Adventure Play Area ===
The facilities at the park include the Adventure Play Area, a playground occupying about 1.1 hectares of land and comprising eight play sets equipped to cater to children of multiple age groups.

== See also ==
- List of parks in Singapore
