= Clementi Woods Park =

Community Park in Singapore

Coordinates: 1°17′55″N 103°46′06″E

- Interactive map of Clementi Woods Park
- Type: Community park
- Location: Clementi, Singapore
- Area: 12 hectares (120,000 m^{2})

Clementi Woods Park is a community park in Singapore that is situated at Clementi Road next to Kent Vale, and along West Coast Road next to West Coast Plaza. It includes a playground, Nature Playgarden, an amphitheatre, and a dog run.

It has served as an outdoor classroom for Ngee Ann Polytechnic students since 2007.

== See also ==
- List of parks in Singapore
