= 2005 in Singapore =

- Decades: 1980s; 1990s; 2000s; 2010s; 2020s
- See also: Other events of 2005; Timeline of Singaporean history

The following lists events that happened during 2005 in Singapore.

== Incumbents ==
- President: S. R. Nathan
- Prime Minister: Lee Hsien Loong

== Events ==
=== January ===
- 1 January –
  - 2004 media merger:
    - Channel U is transferred to national broadcaster Mediacorp, and Channel i ceases transmission.
    - Streats ceases publication and merges with Today.
  - The Competition and Consumer Commission of Singapore is formed to ensure fair competition.
  - The NUS High School of Math and Science is officially opened.
- 11 January –
  - The Building and Construction Authority launches the Green Mark for Buildings Scheme (Green Mark) to encourage buildings to have environmentally friendly features.
  - Targets for tourism are unveiled, aiming for 17 million arrivals, S$30 billion in tourism receipts and an additional 100,000 jobs by 2015.
- 16 January – The Singapore national football team wins the 2004 AFF Championship.
- 29 January – The West section of the Sengkang LRT line and East section of the Punggol LRT line are opened.

=== February ===
- 4 February – After a successful trial, Vehicle Entry Permit (VEP) hours will end at 5pm on all weekdays in a bid to attract tourists into Singapore.
- 23 February – SMRT's Raffles Xchange is officially opened, leading to more of such hubs in subsequent years.

=== March ===
- 7 March – The Housing and Development Board announced a new scheme known as the Design, Build and Sell Scheme. This allows private developers to develop public housing. However, expensive prices caused complaints, leading to the scheme being discontinued in 2011.
- 16 March – The Sentosa Monorail ceases operation after being bogged down by maintenance issues and complaints. It has since been replaced by the upcoming Sentosa Express.
- 22 March – The Marina Barrage starts construction, with completion by 2007. The project will form the Marina Reservoir, helping in flood prevention in the city, as well as encourage activities around the reservoir.
- 23 March – SAFRA opens its new clubhouse in Mount Faber.
- 29 March –
  - Plans to rejuvenate Orchard Road are announced, with new prime sites for development and short-term sites, a youth space, enhancements for pedestrians and collaborations with stakeholders.
  - The Junction 8 Tower Office is handed over to National Council of Social Service from CapitaLand. This allows Voluntary Welfare Organisations (VWOs) to use the facilities without having to pay rental; only the service and maintenance fees.

=== April ===
- 3 April – The People's Association launches the PAssion Card.
- 4 April – The atm5 network is formed by five qualifying full banks to compete with local banks.
- 8 April – Asia Pacific Breweries opens a new bottling line, which allows for frequent changeovers while maintaining efficiency of beer production.
- 12 April –
  - The Ministry of Education announced that the National University of Singapore (NUS) and Nanyang Technological University (NTU) will be autonomous universities similar to Singapore Management University (SMU) by mid 2006. SMU will be given more autonomy to run its operations.
  - Plans to revamp Palawan Beach are unveiled as part of a makeover for Sentosa, which will be completed by July 2006. Costing $11 million, the revamp will have more recreational, food and beverage and retail shops, entertainment facilities. In addition, water play areas and an amphitheatre for animal and bird shows will be built.
- 14 April – Plans are announced to set up a new Police MRT Unit to enhance the security of Singapore's public transport, in addition to enhancing capabilities in investigating terrorism incidents and incidents involving chemical and biological agents.
- 15 April – The Media Development Authority issues a five-year licence to Rediffusion Singapore for a subscriber-only Digital Audio Broadcasting service, making it the world's first.
- 18 April – The government approves plans to legalise casino gambling and build two Integrated Resorts. The plan is allowed after falling tourist numbers, worsened by investments that failed. However, there is opposition to the plan due to social considerations. As a result, social safeguards will be imposed, including levies of $100 daily or $2,000 annually, a National Council on Problem Gambling, exclusion measures, ban on casino ads, among other measures. In addition, new anti-crime strategies will be adopted.
- 24 April – HomeTeamNS is launched as a merger between the SPANS and CDANS, associations that recognize contributions from police and Civil Defence officers respectively.
- 26 April – Singapore and Malaysia signed a settlement agreement over land reclamation disputes.
- 27 April – UniSim is formed after the restructuring of Singapore Institute of Management, making it Singapore's first private university. This comes after the Ministry of Education allowed the formation of UniSim on 14 January.

=== May ===
- 4 May –
  - The Local Enterprise and Association Development Programme (LEAD) is launched to encourage collaboration between industry associations.
  - Construction for the Low Cost Terminal (renamed to Budget Terminal) starts. When completed, it will serve low-cost carriers.
- 13 May – Shanmugam Murugesu is hanged for drug trafficking.
- 16 May – Amendments to the Registration of Criminals Act are passed to give ex-convicts of minor crimes a second chance provided certain criteria are met. This is done by rendering their criminal records 'spent'. The new procedures have come into effect on 17 October.
- 20 May – The SGH Museum is officially opened.
- 24 May – 'READ! Singapore' is launched at Woodlands Regional Library, thus encouraging people to read more.
- 27 May – The last tranche of the Singapore Premium Food Gifts and the S.P.F.G Boutique Cafe is officially launched.

=== June ===
- 1 June – A new 10-day Vehicle Entry Permit (VEP)-free days scheme starts to make it easier for visitors who drive.
- 14 June – Plans for the Downtown Extension of the Circle MRT line are announced. The Extension will be 3.4 km (2.1 miles) long with 5 stations, targeted for completion by 2012. The plans have been succeeded by the Circle MRT line and Downtown Line Stage 1.
- 15 June – PS I Luv U, a 3G phone drama series will be aired by the end of June, making it Asia's first phone drama series.
- 28 June – The ComCare Fund is launched to help needy Singaporeans. In addition, a Ministerial Committee on Low Wage Workers has been set up to help workers break the poverty trap.

=== July ===
- Early July – National Kidney Foundation Singapore scandal:
  - At the time of the lawsuit, KPMG was commissioned by the new NKF board to study past practices, and its report would be published by December later that year.
  - 11 July – A lawsuit pertaining to NKF was held after CEO T. T. Durai stepped down due to a breach of fiduciary duties as well as a new board and management team was formed. The trial was dropped the following day, and the Ministry of Health demanded that NKF would pay for damages.
  - 14 July – Health Minister Khaw Boon Wan appointed Gerard Ee as the interim chairman and CEO of NKF, after Durai and the NKF board resigned en masse.
  - 16 July – Senior Minister of Singapore Goh Chok Tong's wife Tan Choo Leng also resigned from the patron post for NKF following comments causing an online backlash regarding Durai's salary.
- 1 July – The Media Development Authority eases rules for the promotion of NC16 and M18 films and videos.
- 2 to 9 July – The 117th IOC Session was held at Raffles City Singapore and Esplanade – Theatres on the Bay in Singapore; it was announced on 6 July that London would be selected as the hosting venue for the 2012 Summer Olympics.
- 5 July – CISCO was corporatised as CISCO Security (now Certis Group).
- 11 July – A 14-day trial regarding the Murder of Huang Na (which occurred in October 2004) began with Justice Lai Kew Chai in the High Court. It was announced on 27 August that Took Leng How was found guilty for murder and was given a death penalty; Took was hung later in October 2006.
- 18 July – SATS unveils several new initiatives to enhance passenger service, strength air cargo services and improve inflight dining with new experiences in a S$23 million upgrade.
- 22 July – The new National Library building opened its doors.
- 24 July – Jetstar Asia and ValuAir announced plans to merge, resulting in the formation of Orange Star, a holding company. This marks the first major consolidation of Southeast Asia's low-cost carrier industry.
- 27 July – Teledata's On-Line Ship Superintendent Programme is launched, making it the first e-learning and training programme available in the world.

=== August ===
- 4 August –
  - The Water Wally mascot is launched by Public Utilities Board, along with a new readable report.
  - The Korea-Singapore Free Trade Agreement (KSFTA) is signed.
- 6 August – Thum Ping Tjin swam across the English Channel solo in 12 hours and 24 minutes, becoming the first Singaporean to do so.
- 11 August – A protest which happened at the CPF Building is broken up.
- 13 August – The Extension of Queensway to Ayer Rajah Expressway is officially opened. The project, consisting of the Portsdown Flyover and the Queensway Flyover will ease congestion along Queensway. Despite the construction, Colbar cafe is saved from demolition, which was initially planned.
- 16 August – The first Airbus A380 compatible gate holdroom in Changi Airport is officially opened, giving a boost to the first A380 flight.
- 17 August – Nomination Day for the 2005 Presidential Election: Incumbent President S.R. Nathan won the election via an uncontested walkover since he was the only candidate eligible to contest in the election. Nathan was sworn in for his second term on 1 September.
- 21 August –
  - A new Research, Innovation and Enterprise Council and National Research Foundation will be set up to build up Singapore's R&D capabilities.
  - Several schemes to help the low-income are announced, including the CPF Housing Grant Scheme, raising of MediShield to 85 as opposed to 80 currently, and making MediSave claims more flexible.
  - Proposals to improve education are announced, with Post-Secondary Education Accounts to be created, boosting teaching quality in ITE and Polys, linking Polys with specialised foreign universities (now known as the Polytechnic-Foreign Specialised Institutions (Poly-FSI)) and a new elective programme for NT students.
  - It was unveiled during the National Day Rally that a new shopping mall will be built (now called ION Orchard), as well as plans for the Marina Bay area. A new art gallery will be built too, as well as a garden.
- 26 August – The Singapore Flyer project is back on track after financing of the project is secured, with construction starting a few weeks later.
- 28 August – White elephants are put around the shuttered Buangkok MRT station by a resident, expressing displeasure over the station being disused. On 6 October, the Singapore Police Force issues a stern warning.
- 31 August – The National Council on Problem Gambling is formed to tackle problem gambling, coming after the legalisation of casinos on 18 April.

=== September ===
- 13 September –
  - The first desalination plant, SingSpring, is officially opened.
  - ExxonMobil and NTUC FairPrice announced the extension of their retail alliance to all 77 Esso and Mobil stations. This comes after a successful pilot with 6 stations back in November 2003. When fully converted, this will enable customers to buy groceries at attractive prices while getting fuel.
- 15 September –
  - An expansion to the Singapore Expo is completed, adding four more halls to the existing six.
  - Phone numbers with the prefix '3' become available.
- 19 September – The Deposit Insurance Act is passed to create a deposit insurance scheme that will insure up to $20,000 per depositor per institution, which will be administered by a Deposit Insurance Agency. The scheme comes into effect on 1 April 2006.
- 22 September – The Ministry of Education announced a new strategy known as 'Teach Less, Learn More' to improve teaching quality and enhance student learning.
- 26 September – The Urban Redevelopment Authority announced three post-war buildings will be conserved, namely the Church of the Blessed Sacrament, the former Metropole Cinema, and the former Jurong Town Hall. In addition, modifications to uses of conserved buildings are announced, including having service shops at all levels in Core Areas instead of just the first level, excluding Telok Ayer from the Core Area and expansion of the Kampong Glam exclusion boundary area.
- 28 September – The Singapore Cord Blood Bank is officially opened in KK Women's and Children's Hospital to cater for increased demand for cord blood being used between stem cell transplant patients. This makes it Southeast Asia's first public cord blood bank.
- 30 September – Noise Singapore is launched to encourage young Singaporeans to express interest in various art forms.

=== October ===
- Early October – 2005 dengue outbreak in Singapore: One of the worst dengue epidemic struck nationwide since the 2003 SARS outbreak, with a record 14,209 cases and 27 deaths logged between October until the end of the year.
- 1 October – Reports emerge of three people who will be charged under the Sedition Act for insults.
- 6 October – The 'Go-The-Extra-Mile For Services' (Gems) movement is launched to encourage and raise service standards.
- 15 October – The Ren Ci Community Hospital starts construction. Several rules for IPCs are also announced in the wake of the National Kidney Foundation Singapore scandal.
- 27 October – The Workforce Skills Qualifications (WSQ) is launched to allow workers to upgrade their skills and improve quality of training, running in parallel with the education system. In addition, a new Singapore Institute of Retail Studies (SIRS) will be established by 2006 to upgrade service standards.
- 29 October – Food Republic is officially opened in Wisma Atria as a food court, a joint venture between BreadTalk and Ristoranti Group.

=== November ===
- 1 November – New controls for prepaid SIM cards take effect to deal with security threats caused by anonymity of such cards. Among them are compulsory registration for new and existing customers electronically instead of manually, an age limit of 15 years and above, and limiting the maximum number of prepaid SIM cards to 10 per holder. Unregistered SIM cards will be deactivated from 2 May 2006.
- 14 November – The Jewel Box is officially opened in Mount Faber, formed after refurbishing Mount Faber Cable Car station.
- 17 November – The Red Dot Traffic Museum is officially opened, helping to enhance Singapore as a place of design.
- 19 November – The Republic Polytechnic Centre is officially opened.
- 20 November – Sembawang Bus Interchange is opened.
- 21 November – JTC Corporation will be restructured. This will mean an exit from the ready-built factory market and warehousing activities, and continuing with strategic industrial activities and the standard factories market, which they may divest in future.

End November - Singapore Media Academy is officially opened.

=== December ===
- 2 December –
  - Van Tuong Nguyen is hanged at the Changi Prison after found guilty for drug trafficking, which carries a death penalty under the Misuse of Drugs Act.
  - An accident occurs at Escape Theme Park, leaving two children in critical condition.
- 5 December –
  - Electronic Arts' new studio opens.
  - Crazy Horse Paris starts showing in Singapore, making Singapore the first location. The Ministry of Sound, a pub, opened later that month.
- 15 December – The WE Centre for Addictions Recovery and Education (WE C.A.R.E.) is officially opened to tackle and research addiction and its causes.

== Deaths ==
- 25 January – Abu Bakar Hashim, former President of the Syariah Court (b. 1934).
- 18 April – Dhanalatchimi Devan Nair, former PAP Member of Parliament for Moulmein Constituency, former First Lady of Singapore and wife of 5th President Devan Nair (b. 1925).
- 19 April – Sheng Peck Choo, educator and former Principal of Chung Hwa Girls' High School (b. 1912).
- 2 May – Wee Kim Wee, 4th President of Singapore (b. 1915).
- 6 May – Tham Weng Kuen, murder victim of Muhammad and Ismil bin Kadar (b. 1936).
- 5 June – Wee Chong Jin, 1st Chief Justice of Singapore (b. 1917).
- 14 June – Dennis Bloodworth, journalist (b. 1919).
- 15 June – Liu Hong Mei, victim of the Kallang River body parts murder (b. 1982).
- 2 August – Harun Abdul Ghani, former political secretary at the Ministry of Home Affairs and former PAP Member of Parliament for Hong Kah GRC (b. 1939).
- 22 August – Arunsalam Mahadeva, pioneering journalist, trade unionist and founding Secretary-General of the Singapore National Union of Journalists (b. 1931).
- 2 September – Earl Lu, art patron and philanthropist (b. 1925).
- 7 September – Jane Parangan La Puebla, victim of the Orchard Road body parts murder (b. 1979).
- 13 September – Ho Kien Leong, murder victim of Lim Ah Liang (b. 1968).
- 19 October – Wee Keng Wah, murder victim of Barokah (b. 1930).
- 13 November – Tan Chin Tuan, former Chairman of OCBC Bank (Oversea-Chinese Banking Corporation), philanthropist and former Member of the Legislative Council for the Singapore Chinese Chamber of Commerce (b. 1908).
- 4 December – Ramona Johari, murder victim of Mohammad Zam Abdul Rashid (b. 1967).
- 6 December – Devan Nair, 3rd President of Singapore (b. 1923).
- 24 December – Thein Naing, victim of the Upper Boon Keng Road murder (b. 1964).
