= 2006 in Singapore =

- Decades: 1980s; 1990s; 2000s; 2010s; 2020s
- See also: Other events of 2006; Timeline of Singaporean history

The following lists events that happened during 2006 in Singapore.

== Incumbents ==
- President: S. R. Nathan
- Prime Minister: Lee Hsien Loong

== Events ==
=== January ===
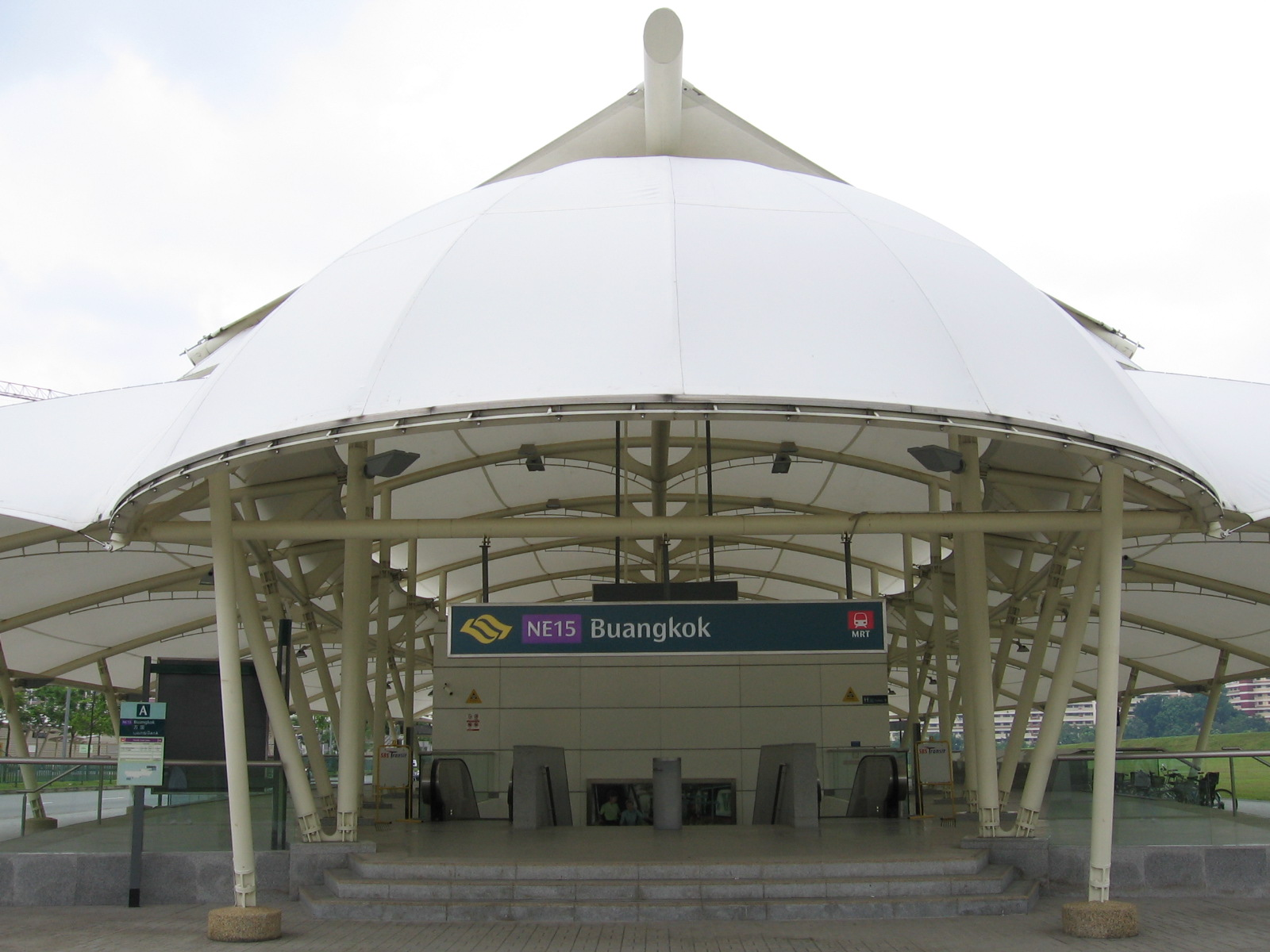
Buangkok MRT station

- 3 January – The National Research Foundation is established to set the direction of research and development initiatives.
- 7 January – The new Supreme Court building is officially opened.
- 8 January – Exercise Northstar V is carried out at Mass Rapid Transit stations and at Toa Payoh Bus Interchange.
- 9 January – The Ministry of Education announced that a single intake for junior college and centralised institute admissions will be implemented from January 2009. This is made possible as the Singapore Examinations and Assessment Board moves to take greater control of the O Level examinations from this year.
- 12 January – The first $2 polymer notes are released.
- 13 January – 27 students from Raffles Girls' School sold white elephant shirts for a carnival at Buangkok MRT station to raise funds for a youth organisation, sparking a police reaction. On 21 January however, then Deputy Prime Minister Wong Kan Seng apologised for the overreaction by the police.
- 15 January – Buangkok MRT station opens on the North East MRT line.
- 16 January – A statement on NS defaulters is delivered in Parliament after the case of Melvyn Tan in 2005. It sparked a controversy due to the fine imposed.
- 17 January – The Workplace Safety and Health Act is passed to ensure better workplace safety and health standards, after several high-profile accidents. The law came into effect on 1 March.
- 19 January – The Somerset Skate Park is officially opened.
- 20 January – The City Campus of Singapore Management University officially opened.
- 23 January – Temasek buys over Shin Corporation with Siam Commercial Bank, causing a controversy. Nonetheless, the deal is completed on 24 March.
- 26 January –
  - I Not Stupid Too is released in cinemas as a sequel to I Not Stupid.
  - Zodiac: The Race Begins is released as Singapore's first 3D animated film.

=== February ===
- 3 February – In response to the Jyllands-Posten Muhammad cartoons controversy, the Islamic Religious Council of Singapore (Majlis Ugama Islam Singapura (MUIS)) issued a statement that says "the inciting of hatred against a faith of a people is very unfortunate." Foreign Minister George Yeo and the Minister-in-charge of Muslim Affairs Yaacob Ibrahim have similarly said that the incident shows the need to respect racial and religious sensitivities, to have a "responsible media", and to cultivate good inter-religious relations and confidence beyond just legislation.
- 8 February – The Monetary Authority of Singapore announced the setting up of Singapore Deposit Insurance Corporation Limited (SDIC) to manage deposit insurance.
- 10 February – The Secretary General of Singapore Democratic Party, Chee Soon Juan, was declared bankrupt by the High Court, after failing to pay S$500,000 in damages awarded to Senior Minister Goh Chok Tong and Minister Mentor Lee Kuan Yew in a defamation lawsuit concerning comments he made during the 2001 election and later, the comments relating to last year's National Kidney Foundation Singapore scandal. Per the bankruptcy order, Chee was barred from participating in the politics (as well as the forthcoming election) for five years.
- 15 February –
  - Ang Soon Tong triad leader Tan Chor Jin used a gun to rob and kill nightclub owner Lim Hock Soon at his apartment. Nicknamed the "One Eyed Dragon", he was sentenced to death and hanged on 9 January 2009.
  - The Ford Motor Factory in Upper Bukit Timah Road, the site of the British surrender to the Japanese during World War II, was gazetted as a national monument.
- 16 February –
  - The Memories at Old Ford Factory is officially opened to showcase the times during World War II.
  - MediaCorp launches MOBTV, a video on demand service.

=== March ===
- 1 March – A case of child rape and murder by drowning occurred at Pipit Road. The victim, Nurasyura binte Mohamed Fauzi, was killed by her stepfather Mohammed Ali bin Johari, who was charged with murder and sentenced to death. Mohammed Ali was hanged on 19 December 2008.
- 3 March –
  - The Additional CPF Housing Grant is announced to help lower-income Singaporeans buy Housing and Development Board (HDB) flats. The scheme has since been enhanced in 2007 and 2009.
  - The Elections Department release the report of the updated electoral boundaries for the general election.
- 10 March – An airport hotel, called Crowne Plaza Changi Airport Hotel at Changi Airport Terminal 3 will open by 2008.
- 11 March – Construction starts on the Boon Lay Extension of the East West MRT line, with the station names unveiled.
- 13 March – The updated Singapore Green Plan 2012 is released, with new targets for clean air, emissions, water consumption, among others.
- 16 March – British monarch Elizabeth II visits Singapore.
- 20 March – The Police Coast Guard's new headquarters on Pulau Brani, called the Brani Regional Base, starts operation, moving from its previous headquarters in Kallang Basin.
- 24 March – ITE College East is officially opened.
- 25 March – The West Coast Highway viaduct is officially opened.
- 26 March –
  - The Budget Terminal in Changi Airport begins operations.
  - The Ministry of Health announced a new general hospital in Woodlands, which will be ready 10 years after the hospital in Yishun is opened.
- 31 March – The Immigration and Checkpoints Authority launches the BioPass, a biometric passport that promises higher security. These passports were rolled out on 15 August.

=== April ===
- 1 April –
  - National University of Singapore and Nanyang Technological University become autonomous universities, thus ceasing to be statutory boards. At the same time, Singapore Management University is given more autonomy. The changes are first announced on 12 April 2005.
  - The Deposit Insurance Scheme is launched to compensate deposits, should a bank or finance company fail.
  - All ferry and launch services are relocated from Clifford Pier to Marina South Pier due to the construction of Marina Barrage.
- 13 April
  - OCBC Bank proposes to sell its stake in Robinsons & Co. to Auric Pacific, a Lippo Group firm.
  - The old Clifford Pier is officially closed, with the pier conserved as part of a future development. Awards to recognise the maritime industry's contributions are announced.
- 16 April – Former National Kidney Foundation's CEO T.T. Durai was arrested for fraud in the wake of the National Kidney Foundation Singapore scandal. Singapore Democratic Party's secretary-general Chee Soon Juan and his party members went to make public backlash to the ruling People's Action Party, but were sued for defamation by the latter on 22 April, and tasked to pay damages by 26 April.
- 19 April – The Straits Times Index sets a high of 2,585.84 points, surpassing the former record of 2,582.94 points from 2000. These record highs continued until 2007.
- 22 April – The Heritage Trees Register and the Young Arborist Programme are launched for the public to learn about the histories of Heritage Trees and raise awareness on conservation, and foster appreciation of trees in the younger generation respectively. At the same time, the number of Heritage Trees has increased from 35 to 161.

=== May ===
- 1 May – The National Family Council is formed to promote families in Singapore.
- 6 May – Polling day for the 2006 Singaporean general election:
  - The ruling People's Action Party winning 82 out of 84 seats (37 of which were uncontested) with a percentage of 66.6% of the total vote. This was the first election since the 1988 election more than a majority of seats were contested and the party did not control the government after Nomination Day (held on 27 April).
  - The remaining two seats for Hougang SMC and Potong Pasir SMC, were retained by the Workers' Party and Singapore Democratic Alliance, respectively.
  - Workers' Party's leader Low Thia Khiang succeeds Singapore Democratic Alliance's leader Chiam See Tong as the Opposition Leader due to a higher party popular vote.
- 7 May – Workers' Party's candidate James Gomez is detained in Singapore for further questioning, after trying to leave for Sweden to return to work. He was released a week later with a formal warning.
- 19 May – Kallang body parts murder murderer Leong Siew Chor received a death sentence for murdering a 22-year-old Chinese national Liu Hong Mei.
- 21 May – The second season of Singapore Idol premieres on MediaCorp's Channel 5 with over a million viewers.
- 22 May – The new Cabinet of Singapore is announced by Prime Minister Lee Hsien Loong, with Minister for Transport Yeo Cheow Tong retiring and five new members of parliament entering political office.
- 25 May – The 145 Squadron, which is the Republic of Singapore Air Force's third generation of fighter planes and its first advanced pilot jet, was launched for the first time.
- 26 May – The government selected Las Vegas Sands as its management for the Integrated Resort at Marina Bay among four casino operators. The project will be finished by 2009.
- 29 May –
  - The Filipino maid, Guen Garlejo Aguilar was sentenced to ten years imprisonment for manslaughtering her best friend.
  - The Tripartite Alliance for Fair Employment Practices is formed to encourage fair employment outcomes in Singapore.

=== June ===
- 1 June –
  - my Paper is launched as a free Mandarin newspaper by Singapore Press Holdings.
  - The Community Court is set up as part of the Subordinate Courts, dealing mainly with cases requiring community intervention.
  - The Casino Control Act comes into force.
- 8 June – Emperor of Japan Akihito visits Singapore for three days with Empress Michiko.
- 14 June – STOMP is launched as a citizen journalism service.
- 26 June – The first wheelchair-accessible bus service is launched.
- 30 June – Marina South Pier is officially opened.

=== July ===
- 6 July – The local free newspaper Today suspends the column of mrbrown in a noted case of censorship in Singapore following a letter from a government official to the letters section of the paper.
- 24 July – A*STAR stops its partnership with Johns Hopkins Medicine.

=== August ===
- 9 August – Singapore celebrates the last National Day Parade for the last time at the National Stadium before it's closed for redevelopment.
- 10 August – The Ministry of Home Affairs and Ministry of Health announced tough measures to curb Subutex abuse, originally allowed in 2000 to help heroin addicts quit.
- 15 August – The JetQuay CIP Terminal began operations.
- 23 August – Singapore announced that their Singapore team were to compete in the upcoming A1 Grand Prix season.

=== September ===
- 1 September – Bishan Public Library is officially opened.
- 2 September – The Home Team Academy is officially opened.
- 11–20 September – The 61st Annual Meetings of the Boards of Governors of the International Monetary Fund and the World Bank Group took place at the Suntec Singapore International Convention and Exhibition Centre.
- 13 September – Upgrades to Changi Airport Terminal 2 are completed, resulting in improvements to the Terminal's design and more commercial space. Upgrades to Changi Airport Terminal 1 are in the pipeline.
- 24 September – St James Power Station opens as a nightclub.
- 25 September – The second season of Singapore Idol ends with Hady Mirza winning the honour of being the second Singapore Idol.
- 28 September – The Ministry of Education announced that EM3 and other streams will be abolished, leading to Subject-Based Banding in primary schools. The change takes effect in 2008.
- 29 September – Changi Airport's CIP Terminal opens as a facility for commercially important people, managed by JetQuay.

=== October ===
- 5 October – The Marina Bay Financial Centre is launched. It will be a mixed-use development with office buildings and a commercial district, making it the largest commercial centre in Singapore. The development will also have environmentally friendly features. Developed by Cheung Kong Holdings, Hongkong Land and Keppel Land, the development officially opened in 2013.
- 7 October – Singapore experiences the worst haze since 1997 with the Pollutant Standards Index reaching a high of 150.
- 12 October – REACH is formed to connect with citizens.
- 30 October – Phase 2 of Biopolis is opened, adding two buildings to the existing seven.
- 31 October
  - The Orchard Turn development (now ION Orchard and The Orchard Residences) starts construction as a mall-cum-residential development, jointly developed by CapitaLand and Sun Hung Kai Properties.
  - Changi Airport's Budget Terminal officially opens.

=== November ===
- 5 November – The first refurbished C151 train enters service, with the whole project completed by 2008.
- 8 November – The Ministry of Home Affairs announced several proposed changes to the Penal Code, including modifying the marital immunity currently enjoyed by a husband against raping his wife, and to decriminalise oral and anal sex by a consenting heterosexual couple aged 16 years and above. A one-month consultation is subsequently held.
- 10 November - Jurong West Sports and Recreation Centre is progressively opened, but officially opened on 28 October the following year.
- 30 November – IKEA opens a new store in Tampines Retail Park.

=== December ===
- 1 December –
  - VivoCity is officially open to the public.
  - Wireless@SG is officially launched at several hotspots, allowing for free WiFi connections in public spaces.
- 6 December – Phase 2A of Fusionopolis starts construction.
- 8 December –
  - The National Museum of Singapore officially reopened.
  - The government selects Genting Group and Star Cruises as its management for the Integrated Resort at Sentosa among three casino operators.
- 16 December – Courts opens Courts Megastore in Tampines, followed by Giant Hypermarket opening in Tampines in 2007.

== Births ==
- 27 June - Jonan Tan, footballer
- 9 August - Iryan Fandi, footballer
- 12 September - Maximilian Maeder, kitesurfer.

== Deaths ==
- 11 January – Ho Yuen Hoe, Buddhist nun known as Singapore's "grand dame of charity" (b. 1908).
- 15 February – Lim Hock Soon, Singaporean nightclub owner murdered by Tan Chor Jin (b. 1965).
- 22 February – S. Rajaratnam, former Deputy Prime Minister and Senior Minister (b. 1915).
- 27 February – Lai Kew Chai, judge (b. 1941).
- 1 March – Nurasyura binte Mohamed Fauzi, murder victim of Mohammed Ali bin Johari (b. 2003).
- 23 May – Wu Peng Seng, photographer (b. 1915).
- 30 May – Wan Cheon Kem, murder victim of Nakamuthu Balakrishnan, Daniel Vijay Katherasan, and Christopher Samson Anpalagan (b. 1960).
- 18 June – Yu Hongjin, victim of the Ang Mo Kio massage parlour murder (b. 1977).
- 19 June – Arthur Yap, poet (b. 1943).
- 12 July – Humphrey Morrison Burkill, director of Singapore Botanic Gardens from 1957 to 1969 (b. 1914).
- 20 July – Lim Kim San, former Cabinet Minister (b. 1916).
- 25 July – Chen Jin Lang, former songwriter (b. 1961).
- 2 September – Anthony Poon, artist (b. 1945).
- 14 September – Elizabeth Choy, educator, war heroine, politician (b. 1910).
- 2 November – Lin You Eng, former legislative assemblyman for Moulmein Constituency who defected from the People's Action Party (PAP) to Barisan Sosialis (BS) (b. 1925).
- 27 November – Ong Chye Ann, former CEC member and short-time treasurer of the People's Action Party (b. 1929).
- 5 December – Lim Chor Pee, lawyer and playwright (b. 1936).
