= DBSS =

DBSS may refer to:

- Defense blood standard system in the United States
- Design, Build and Sell Scheme in Singapore
