= Charles Letts =

English entrepreneur

- Born: 16 August 1918; Send, Surrey, England
- Died: 23 October 2013 (aged 95); Singapore
- Occupation: Entrepreneur
- Spouse(s): Cecilia ("Sissi") Monro; Cecilia Choo
- Children: Billie Letts

Lionel Edgar Charles Letts BEM (15 August 1918 – 23 October 2013) was an English entrepreneur notable for a 75-year career in Southeast Asia during which he took a role on the boards of more than 90 listed companies, survived torture, multiple escape attempts and a death sentence as a Japanese Prisoner of War and acted as a spy on behalf of the British Secret Intelligence Service.

== Personal life ==
Letts was born in the English village of Send two months before the end of World War I, the son of Frederick James Letts, a hairdresser, and Eva Catherine Watts. While a Staff Captain in the Army he married Cecilia Monro on 29 December 1945 in Bangkok, Thailand.

== Military career ==
Letts fought with the International Brigades during the Spanish Civil War and with the Free Thai Movement during World War II

== Business career ==
Letts played a significant role in the sale of British owned assets in Southeast Asia during the period after World War II, in the process making deep connections with numerous individuals whose families would go on to accumulate huge wealth as the British Empire rolled back in Asia.

== Diplomatic Roles ==
In later life Letts acted as Honorary Consul in Singapore for Brazil and Portugal.

== Decorations ==
During his lifetime Letts was awarded the British Empire Medal, became a Chevalier of the Brazilian Order of the Southern Cross and was made a Knight of the Norwegian Order of Merit.

== Donation To T. T. Durai ==
Letts helped to save disgraced former Chief Executive Officer of the National Kidney Foundation Singapore, T. T. Durai, from bankruptcy, with a gift of $1 million.
