= AHG =

AHG may refer to:

- Additional CPF Housing Grant, a housing subsidy in Singapore
- American Heritage Girls, a youth organisation in the US
- Anchor Hanover Group, a UK Housing Association
- Automotive Holdings Group, an Australian company
- Qimant language, a language spoken in part of Ethiopia
- Anatolian hunter-gatherers, component in the population genetics of Europe
