= Tan Choo Leng =

Singaporean lawyer

- 陈子玲

Spouse of the Prime Minister of Singapore
- In role 28 November 1990 – 12 August 2004
- Prime Minister: Goh Chok Tong
- Preceded by: Kwa Geok Choo
- Succeeded by: Ho Ching

Personal details
- Born: Singapore, Straits Settlements
- Party: People's Action Party
- Spouse: Goh Chok Tong (m. 1965)
- Education: University of Singapore (LLB)
- Profession: Lawyer

Tan Choo Leng (simplified Chinese: 陈子玲; traditional Chinese: 陳子玲; Pe̍h-ōe-jī: Tân Chú-lêng; pinyin: Chén Zǐlíng) is a Singaporean lawyer. The wife of Singapore's second Prime Minister, Goh Chok Tong, Tan took the role of the spouse of the Prime Minister of Singapore between 1990 and 2004.

== Early life and career ==
Tan graduated from the University of Singapore (now the National University of Singapore) with Bachelor of Laws degree. She is currently an advocate and solicitor for WongPartnership LLP.

== Philanthropy ==
Tan has given her support to many charities, and was best known for being a patron of the National Kidney Foundation (NKF).

== Controversy ==
During the 2005 NKF scandal, Tan commented that the annual salary of S$600,000 drawn by NKF's chief executive officer T. T. Durai was considered "peanuts" as compared to the hundreds of millions of dollars managed by the NKF. Her remark was subsequently met with negative reactions from many Singaporeans.

Blogs and online message boards were quickly flooded with angry comments, and a second online petition requesting Tan to apologise was started. Jokes on the issue were later circulated, in particular, local satirical website TalkingCock.com published a post featuring a parody 1 peanut bill with a value equivalent to S$600,000.

On 16 July 2005, Senior Minister Goh said that Tan regretted the statement. He also said to have explained and shown her several e-mails and letters he had received after the remark was made. In what Goh claimed to be of a separate matter, Tan had also resigned as patron of the NKF, despite an earlier announcement to remain on the board.
