= WSQ =

WSQ can refer to:

- Wavelet Scalar Quantization, a fingerprint image compression algorithm
- Workforce Skills Qualifications, Singapore national continuing education and training system
- World Saxophone Quartet
- WSQ (journal): Women's Studies Quarterly, an academic journal
- W.S.Q. (album)
