= SIA-NKF Dialysis Centre =

Medical facility in Singapore

Coordinates: 1.3395°N 103.8535°E

The SIA-NKF Dialysis Centre is a dialysis centre in Toa Payoh, Singapore, and was the first dialysis centre outside of a hospital in Singapore.

== History ==
The SIA-NKF Dialysis Centre, short for the Singapore Airlines-National Kidney Foundation Dialysis Centre, was opened on 24 December 1987 by the second deputy prime minister Ong Teng Cheong. The dialysis centre offered dialysis at cheaper costs as compared to treatments at private hospitals. The dialysis centre was sponsored by Singapore Airlines, who donated either $223,000, $233,000, or $250,000 to set up the centre. The centre cost $400,000 to construct. It was originally speculated that the centre was to be located in Ang Mo Kio. However, the dialysis centre ended up being located in the void deck of 220 Lorong 8 Toa Payoh instead. Besides being the first kidney dialysis centre outside of a hospital in Singapore, it was also possibly the first one in Southeast Asia. However, initially, the centre could only accommodate for 40 patients a month.

The dialysis centre has been included in the Toa Payoh Heritage Trail by the National Heritage Board.
