= Buangkok Bus Interchange =

Bus Interchange in Buangkok

Buangkok Bus Interchange 万国巴士转换站 Pusat Pertukaran Bas Buangkok
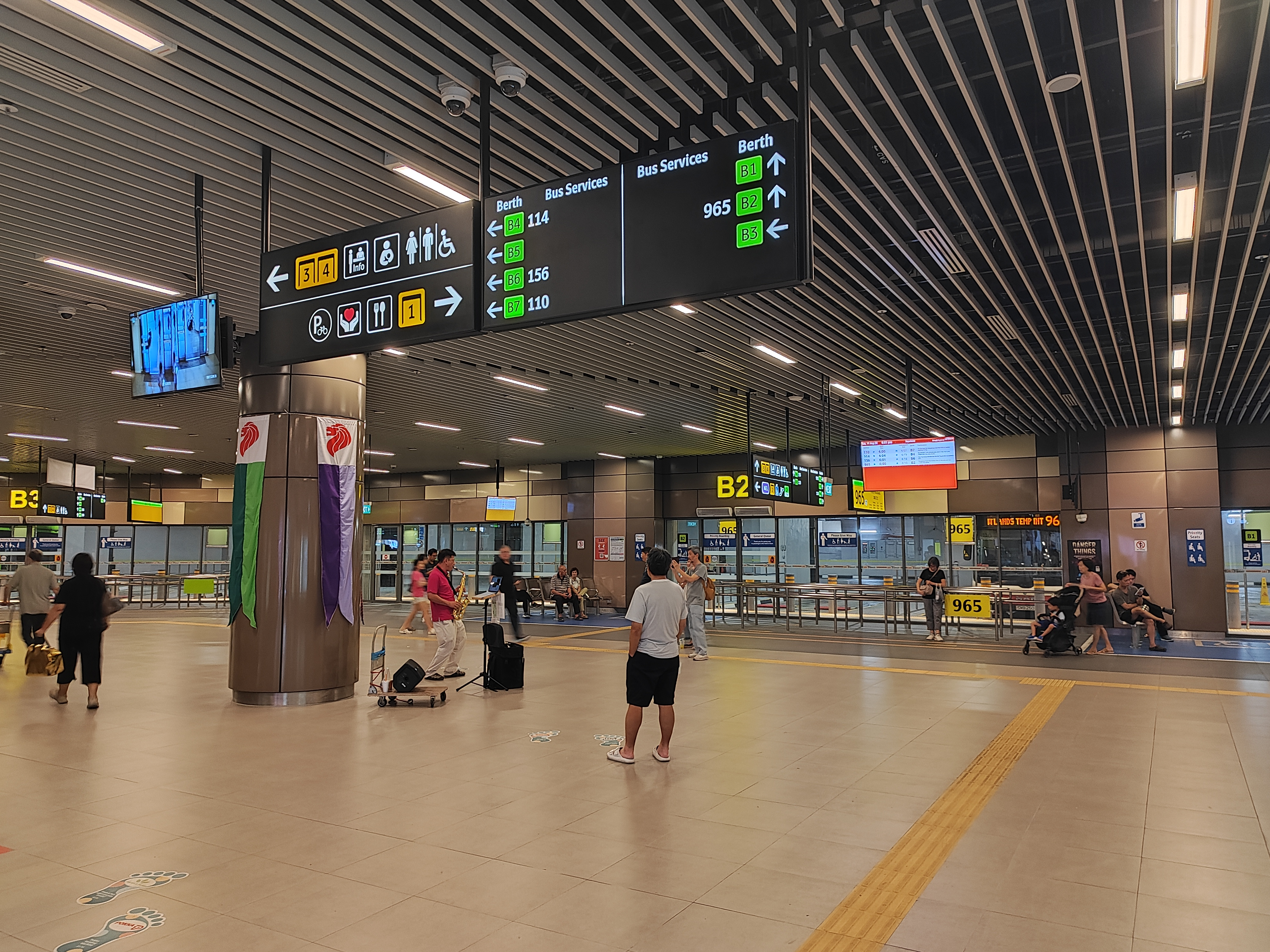
- Buangkok Bus Interchange

General information
- Location: 11 Sengkang Central, Singapore 544575
- System: Public Bus Interchange
- Owner: Land Transport Authority
- Operator: SBS Transit
- Bus routes: 2 (SBS Transit); 1 (SMRT Buses); 1 (Tower Transit Singapore)
- Bus stands: 7 End-on Boarding Berths
- Bus operators: SBS Transit; SMRT Buses; Tower Transit Singapore
- Connections: NE15 Buangkok

Construction
- Structure type: At-grade
- Accessible: Accessible alighting/boarding points Accessible public toilets Graduated kerb edges Tactile guidance system

History
- Opened: 1 December 2024; 21 months ago

Key dates
- 1 December 2024: Commenced operations
Location

Buangkok Bus Interchange is an air-conditioned bus interchange located at Buangkok. It is situated within the Sengkang Grand Mall integrated development, comprising a 3-level retail mall, a hawker centre, a childcare centre, a community club, and a condominium. It is also linked with Buangkok MRT station and serves the surrounding residential estates of Buangkok, Compassvale, and parts of Hougang.

== History ==
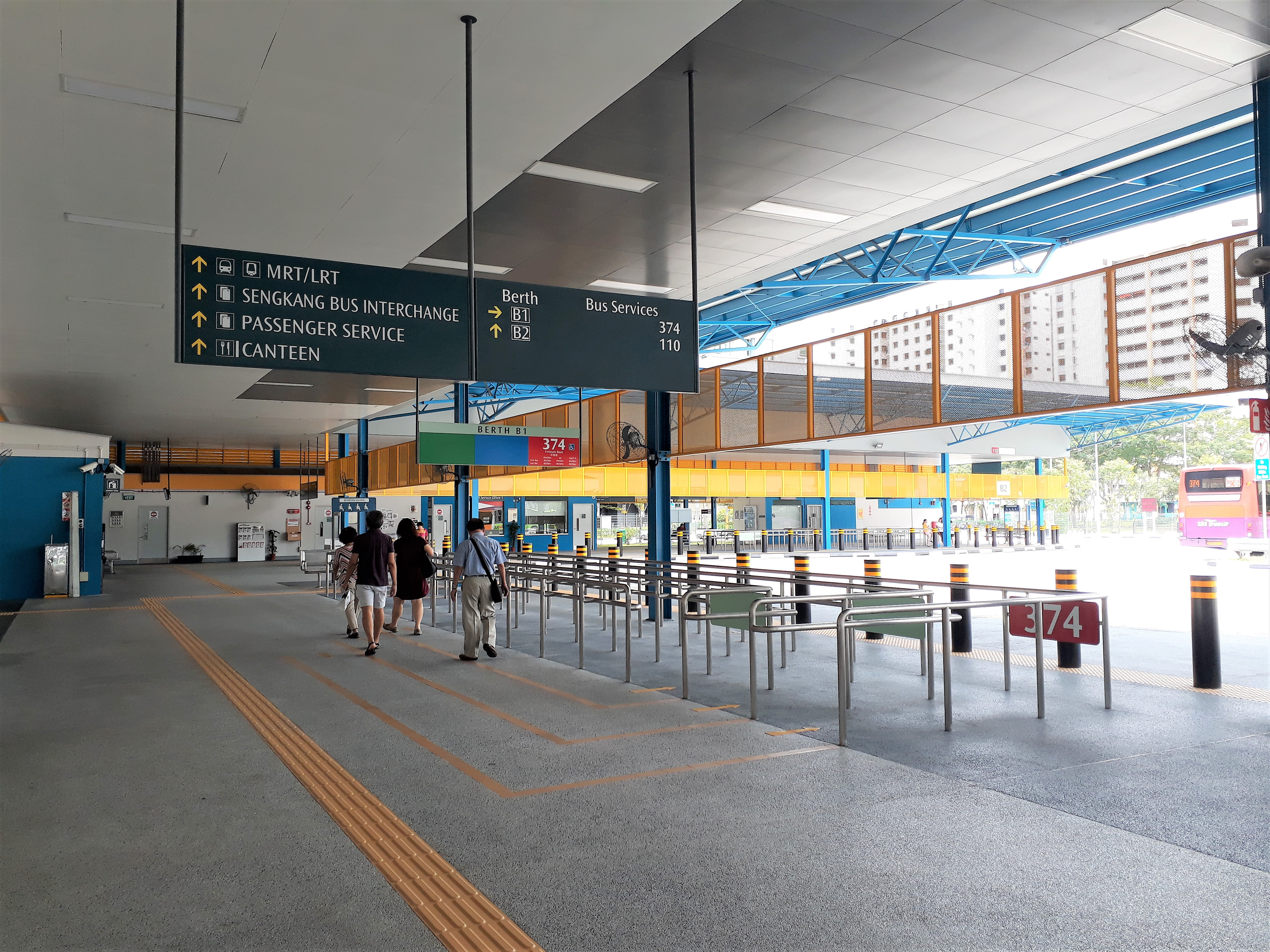
The former Compassvale Bus Interchange which served the area prior to the opening of Buangkok Bus Interchange.

Plans for a new integrated commercial and residential project adjacent to Buangkok MRT station, which includes a new bus interchange, were officially unveiled in Urban Redevelopment Authority's (URA) Master Plan 2019. Buangkok Bus Interchange officially commenced operations on 1 December 2024, with three existing bus services, 110, 114 and 156, amended to the interchange on the same day. Compassvale Bus Interchange, which formerly housed service 110, ceased operations on the same day.

== Bus contracting model ==
Under the bus contracting model, all bus services operating from Buangkok Bus Interchange were divided into four bus packages, operated by three different bus operators.

=== List of bus services ===
Operator	Package	Service	Berth	Destination	Remarks
SBS Transit	Clementi	156	B6	Clementi	—N/a
SBS Transit	Sengkang–Hougang	114	B4	Yio Chu Kang	—N/a
SBS Transit	Sengkang–Hougang	114A	B4	Buangkok Link (Blk 991B)	Short trip service
SMRT Buses	Woodlands	110	B7	↺ Changi Airport	—N/a
Tower Transit Singapore	Sembawang–Yishun	965	B2	Woodlands (Temporary Bus Interchange)	—N/a
