= Upper Boon Keng Road murder =

2005 robbery-murder of a Myanmar national in Singapore

Thein Naing
- Born: 1964; Myanmar
- Died: 24 December 2005 (aged 41); Upper Boon Keng Road, Singapore
- Cause of death: Murdered
- Occupation: Air conditioner repairman (former)
- Known for: Murder victim
- Children: 2+

On the night of Christmas Eve, 24 December 2005, 41-year-old Burmese national Thein Naing was brutally assaulted and murdered by a group of three Malaysians, who robbed him of S$40, on a footpath along Upper Boon Keng Road. The three killers, together with a fourth man who acted as a lookout, were all arrested and charged with murder. Hamir bin Hasim, Kamal bin Kupli and Abdul Malik bin Usman—the trio which had fatally assaulted Thein—were identified as responsible for said assault; on 1 March 2007, they were found guilty of murder and sentenced to death. They were hanged later in 2008 after losing their appeals in February. Benedict Inyang Anak Igal, the fourth robber, was sentenced to five years' jail and 12 strokes of the cane for robbery with hurt.

== Murder of Thein Naing ==
At about 1 am on the Christmas Day of 2005 (25 December 2005), a passer-by named Mohamed Sirat bin Mohamed Mokri discovered the body of a man lying on a concrete footpath between a HDB block of flats and the defunct campus of Boon Keng Primary School along Upper Boon Keng Road. Shocked by the gruesome discovery, Mohamed Sirat reported the discovery to the police and the man was later confirmed to be dead. There were also head injuries found on the man's head.

The victim was identified as 41-year-old Thein Naing, a Myanmar national of Chinese ethnicity who worked as an air conditioner repairman in Singapore. At the time of his death, Thein left behind a wife and at least two children; his eldest son was a university student and his youngest daughter was only one year old. According to Dr Teo Eng Swee, the forensic pathologist who examined Thein's body, he found that there were six stab wounds on Thein's body and several facial and skull fractures on his head. Dr Teo determined that the severe head injuries were the cause of his death.

== Arrests ==
The police classified the case as murder, and promptly conducted their investigations. Eu Ah Bar, the night watchman of Boon Keng Primary School, later told police that on the previous night of Christmas Eve, hours before the discovery of Thein's corpse, he saw a group of three men, who all appeared to be pushing and kicking something on the footpath along the fence of the school, after he was alerted by the barking sounds of his dog and therefore witnessed the sighting, which he presumed as an issue of older boys playing with each other. A trail of bloodstains measured about 300m long was discovered by the police, ending at the junction of Geylang Lorong 3 and Sims Avenue. Residents living nearby the murder scene were shocked to hear about the crime and some were awakened from their sleep when they heard possible screams from the victim, and there were speculations on whether the blood from the bloody trail belonged to the victim or his killer(s); residents also revealed that there were often instances of people fighting at the void decks. The nearby residential areas along Upper Boon Keng Road were also cordoned by police while they were conducting investigations on the case.

It was also theorized that Thein was probably attacked and assaulted to death outside the former school campus, and the police did not find any possible murder weapons nearby the crime scene. The area itself was also remote and near to a construction site, so there were no other witnesses to the crime. No one else also heard any sounds calling for help.

On 1 January 2006, a week after the murder of Thein Naing, it was reported that the police managed to arrest four Malaysians who were allegedly responsible for the killing. The four Malaysians - 25-year-old Abdul Malik bin Usman, 21-year-old Kamal bin Kupli, 20-year-old Hamir bin Hasim and 17-year-old Benedict Inyang Anak Igal (also spelt Benedict Inyang Anak Igai) - were charged with murder on 2 January 2006. One of the four men, Hamir came from Johor and he worked as a gardener in Singapore, while both Abdul Malik and Kamal came from Sabah and they were both employed as cleaners in Singapore. A penknife and some clothes stained with blood were also recovered by the police during the four men's arrests.

On 10 January 2006, days after the four suspects were charged with his murder, Thein Naing's body was cremated after a funeral, and his ashes and belongings were returned to his family in Myanmar.

== Murder trial ==
In February 2007, three of the four suspects - Abdul Malik bin Usman, Kamal bin Kupli and Hamir Hasim - claimed trial at the High Court for the murder of Thein Naing back on the Christmas Eve night of 2005. As for Benedict Inyang Anak Igal, the fourth perpetrator of the crime, he was found guilty of a reduced charge of robbery with hurt and sentenced to five years in prison and 12 strokes of the cane before the trio went on trial for Thein Naing's murder.

The court was told of the forensic evidence that helped reveal the cause of death. Aside from the autopsy report, a forensic scientist Dr Lim Chin Chin also presented her laboratory reports that there were shoe imprints on the forehead of Thein, and these imprints matched to those of the shoe patterns on Kamal's shoe. DNA tests were also conducted, and traces of the victim's DNA were discovered on the penknife belonging to Hamir, and the bloodstains on the shoes belonging to Abdul Malik were also found to have matched Thein's DNA.

In their defence, the men denied that they had the intention to cause Thein Naing's death, and according to them, the trio and the fourth man Benedict were having drinks at Geylang on the night of the murder, and as they were short of money, they decided to go and commit robbery. They spotted Thein walking alone on the footpath at Upper Boon Keng Road, and with Benedict acting as a lookout, the three accused sprung their attack on Thein, stabbing him and assaulting him as he tried to resist the trio's blows. But eventually, Thein was overpowered and he was grievously assaulted and died from the head injuries he sustained; the six knife wounds sustained by Thein, which were caused by Hamir during the assault, were also fatal in nature, but the head injuries were more severe and were the immediate cause of Thein's death. After they assaulted Thein until he could no longer get up, the trio therefore stole his wallet and got S$40 in cash, and the trio, together with Benedict, divided the money equally among themselves.

On 28 February 2007, the trial judge, Justice Kan Ting Chiu, delivered his judgement. He rejected the trio's respective defences that they only intend to rob but not to kill. Justice Kan found that there was no doubt that the trio shared a common intention to rob Thein, and assaulted him in furtherance of the same common intention. Although he accepted that the knife wounds were not fatal, Justice Kan nonetheless made a finding that the trio had intentionally inflicted the serious head injuries on Thein when they kicked him repeatedly, such that the head injuries caused were sufficient in the ordinary course of nature to cause death, and these were inflicted while in furtherance of their common intention, there were sufficient grounds to return with a verdict of murder in the trio's case.

As a result, the three men - Hamir bin Hasim, Kamal bin Kupli and Abdul Malik bin Usman - were found guilty of murder and sentenced to death. For all four degrees of murder offences under Singaporean law, the death penalty was prescribed as the mandatory punishment upon an offender's conviction.

== Appeals of the trio ==
On 19 February 2008, the three condemned - Abdul Malik bin Usman, Kamal bin Kupli and Hamir Hasim - lost their appeals against their convictions and sentences. The Court of Appeal, having heard their cases, found that there was no doubt that the trio had intentionally inflicted the fatal head injuries on Thein Naing for the purpose of committing robbery.

One of the appellate judges, Justice V K Rajah, commented in his own words while dismissing the appeals, "It doesn't take a rocket scientist to see that stomping on a person's head could be fatal". Reportedly, Hamir's father and one of his brothers were present to hear the appeal verdict.

== Aftermath ==
After receiving news that the appeals of the trio were dismissed, international human rights group Amnesty International filed a public plea to the Singapore government for clemency, asking that the death sentences of the trio should be commuted to life imprisonment, and similarly, both the Malaysian Bar and Asian Human Rights Commission (AHRC) also sought to appeal for mercy on the lives of the trio and urged Singapore to not carry out their executions. Human rights lawyer M Ravi also posted that the death penalty for the trio should be commuted and claimed that there was no fair trial for the three Malaysians and a fourth convicted killer Tan Chor Jin, who was sentenced to hang for fatally shooting a nightclub owner after he claimed trial while unrepresented by counsel; Tan was put to death on 9 January 2009 after his petition for clemency was rejected.

On 9 April 2008, the Singapore government responded to the United Nations Human Rights Office (OHCHR) that the death penalty was not arbitrarily or unfairly imposed in the cases of Tan and the three Thein Naing murderers, stating that the four men had been accorded full due process and except for Tan who represented himself, the trio had been represented by legal counsel throughout and they emphasized that the international law did not prohibit the mandatory death penalty and it was only reserved for the most serious of crimes, and the use of capital punishment in Singapore was what contributes to its reputation as one of the safest countries in the world.

After the Singaporean authorities refused to review or commute their death sentences, the three men - Kamal bin Kupli, Abdul Malik bin Usman and Hamir bin Hasim - were eventually hanged later that same year for murdering Thein Naing. The trio were among the four people executed in Singapore for murder during the year of 2008; the fourth and final person to be put to death for murder was Mohammed Ali bin Johari, who was convicted and hanged on 19 December 2008 for the rape-murder of his stepdaughter Nonoi.

In March 2012, about four years after the trio's executions, Singaporean crime show Crimewatch re-enacted the Upper Boon Keng Road murder and aired it as the first episode of the show's annual season. It was revealed through this episode that the group responsible for Thein's murder were previously involved in at least two other robberies during that same year before killing Thein, and the victims (all were male) in these cases were assaulted and knocked out after having their valuables stolen, but unlike Thein, none of the victims in these other cases died. The actors portraying the killers in this episode were also depicted to be conversing in Malay with English subtitles provided to translate their corresponding dialogues.

== See also ==
- Capital punishment in Singapore
