= Buangkok =

Coordinates: 1°22′45.1″N 103°52′52.8″E

- Neighbourhood of Sengkang and Hougang planning area

Name transcription(s)
  - Chinese: 万国 (Simplified) 萬國 (Traditional); Wànguó (Pinyin); Bān-kok (Hokkien POJ); Buāng-kok (Teochew PUJ)
  - Malay: Buangkok
  - Tamil: புவாங்கோக் Puvāṅkōk (Transliteration)
- Location of Buangkok within Singapore
- Country: Singapore

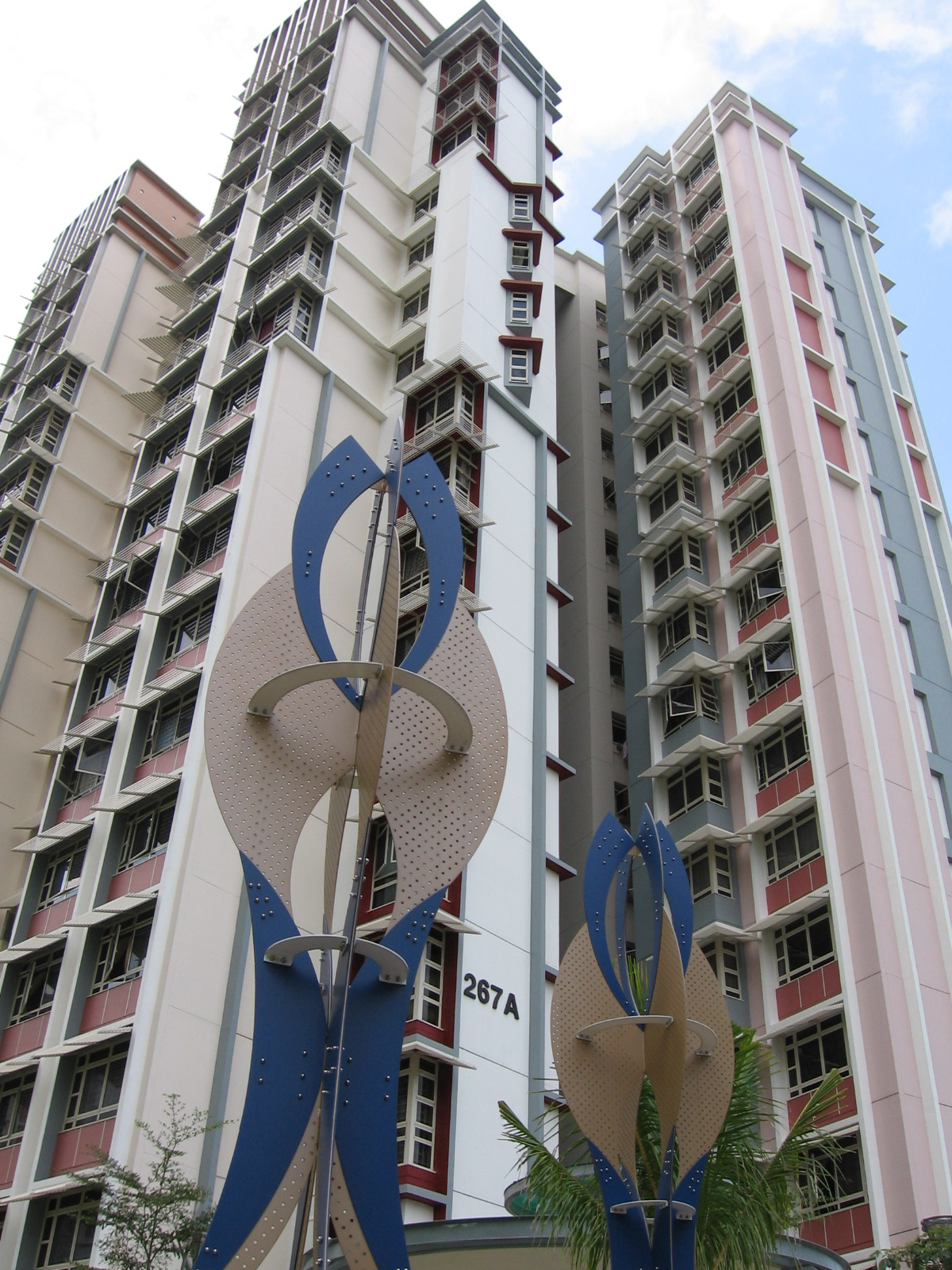
Buangkok includes public housing estates in the southern portion of Compassvale in Sengkang New Town.

Buangkok
- Traditional Chinese: 萬國
- Simplified Chinese: 万国
Transcriptions
Standard Mandarin
- Hanyu Pinyin: Wàn guó
- IPA: [wân.kwǒ]

Buangkok is a neighbourhood located in north eastern Singapore. The neighbourhood roughly encompasses the Trafalgar and Compassvale subzones of the Hougang and Sengkang planning areas respectively, as designated by the Urban Redevelopment Authority (URA). It is not a subzone in itself.

== Etymology ==
The namesake road Lorong Buangkok was named Buangkok, meaning "ten thousand countries", after the rubber plantation company Singapore United Rubber Plantations Limited's Chinese name "Multi Nations" (万国) in Teochew. In 1967, a track off Lorong Buangkok was named Lorong Buangkok Kechil.

== History ==
Chinese farmers settled on the land in this vicinity in the early twentieth century. The land belonged partly to the state and partly to Singapore United Rubber Plantation Limited.

When Sengkang was developed in the late 1990s, a large section of Lorong Buangkok was removed for the development of the new town. Today, Lorong Buangkok is truncated into two sections — one located at the west end of Buangkok with its entrance near Yio Chu Kang Road, and the other much shorter section located within Sengkang near Punggol Road.

Buangkok was once filled and overcrowded by kampongs and villages. These were cleared between 2005 and 2009. The last kampong, Kampong Lorong Buangkok is the only remaining village and is conserved.

Buangkok Drive is a road that was completed in the second half of 1999 from Buangkok Green to Punggol Road, as the road shortens the travel drive from Ang Mo Kio Avenue 5 to Punggol Road. The second section was opened all the way to Upper Serangoon Road in December 2001 together with the extension of Upper Serangoon Road all the way to Punggol East which was opened in 2002. Buangkok East Drive was subsequently opened on 22 March 2009, all the way to the Tampines Road. Yet another Buangkok Drive extension, from Buangkok Green to Buangkok Link started construction in 2017, and was opened on 25 August 2019. The final extension from Buangkok Link to Yio Chu Kang Road has also started construction, and will be completed by 2025. Construction of the road began in 2021.

== Transportation ==
Buangkok MRT station (NE15) on the North East line of the Singapore MRT serves the residents of Buangkok. It was opened on 15 January 2006. The station is served by bus services 27, 43, 43e, 43M, 102 and 114. In addition, bus services 101 and 329 enters the western part of Buangkok, with bus services 43, 104, 88, 109, 156, 159, 161, 325, 575, 660, 672 and 729 passing by. Bus service 329 was introduced on 9 July 2017.

The Buangkok Bus Interchange, which is part of a mixed, integrated development called Sengkang Grand Residences & Mall, is finished its construction, and has the bus services 110, 114, 114A and 156.

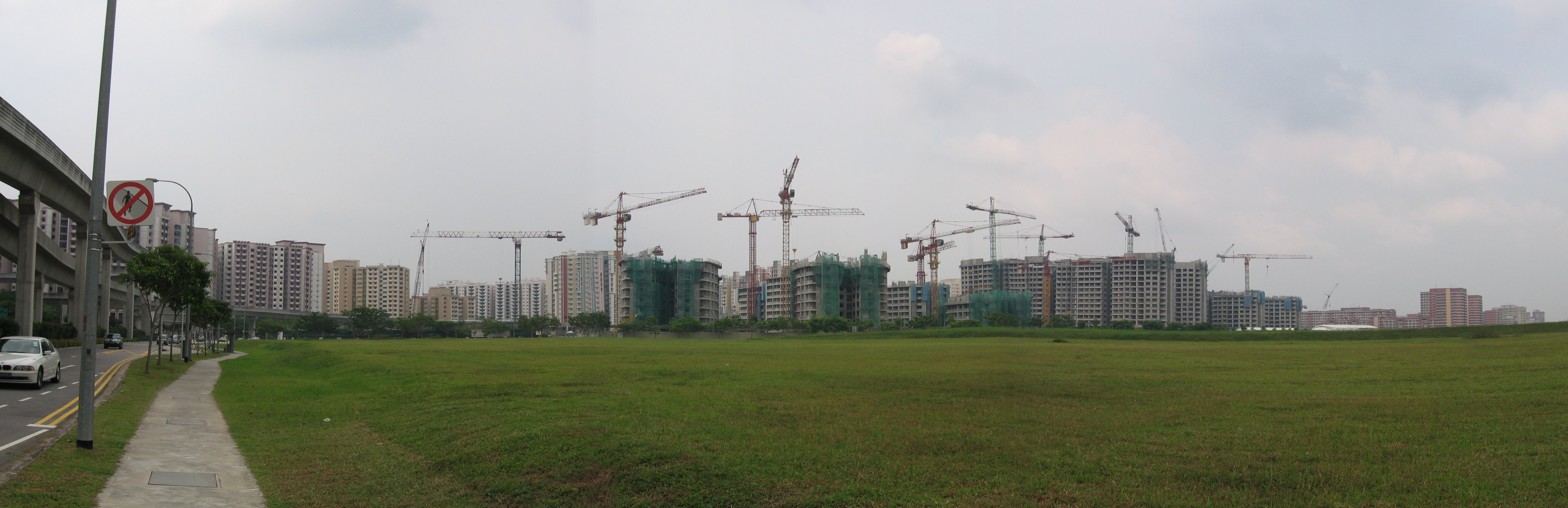
Panoramic view of Buangkok in 2006. The area has since been extensively developed.

== Amenities ==
=== Shopping ===
- Kopitiam City
- Sengkang Grand Mall and Residences
- Buangkok Square Mall

=== Parks ===
- Buangkok Sports Park
- Buangkok Square Park
- Compassvale Ancilla Park
- Buangkok Forest
