= Khoo Oon Teik =

Singaporean nephrologist (1921–2012)

Khoo Oon Teik BBM
- Born: 30 March 1921; Penang, Straits Settlements, British Malaya
- Died: 5 March 2012 (aged 90); Singapore
- Education: University of Malaya (MD); King Edward VII College of Medicine (LMS)
- Spouse: Adeline Phoa (m. 1947–1996)
- Children: 4

Chinese name
- Traditional Chinese: 邱恩德
- Simplified Chinese: 邱恩德
Transcriptions
Standard Mandarin
- Hanyu Pinyin: Qiū Ēndé
- IPA: [tɕʰjóʊ.ɤn.tɤ̌]

Khoo Oon Teik (Note: Chinese: see Chinese name and romanisations) BBM (30 March 1921 – 5 March 2012) was a Singaporean nephrologist and founder of National Kidney Foundation.

== Early life and education ==
On 30 March 1921, Khoo Oon Teik was born in Penang to a Chinese family, and was the second eldest among his nine siblings. His father, Reverend Khoo Cheng Hoe, was a pastor of the Chinese Methodist Church at Madras Lane, Penang, and his mother, Kwan Chin Poh, was studying at the Eveland Seminary in Singapore before marriage in March 1919.

Khoo enrolled in the Anglo-Chinese School, Penang, and graduated with a Senior Cambridge in 1937. He was awarded a scholarship to study medicine at the King Edward VII College of Medicine (KECM). His studies were disrupted by the Japanese occupation of Singapore, and he was appointed as a section leader of the Medical Auxiliary Service, organising medical students and staff of the college to render medical assistance to the injured.

In 1942, Khoo served as a laboratory assistant in the Mental Hospital, and in 1944, he was sent to work on the Burma Railway. After the war ended, Khoo resumed his studies and graduated with a Licentiate in Medicine and Surgery in 1946.

In October 1951, Khoo left for United Kingdom to further his studies in medicine, specifically on dermatology, neurology, and chest-related diseases. On 19 December 1952, Khoo graduated from the University of Malaya with a Doctor of Medicine.

== Career ==
In 1947, Khoo began his career as a medical officer at the General Hospital, and as a lecturer in clinical medicine at KECM. In 1948, he started a skin and leprosy clinic within the hospital, marking the start of dermatology in Singapore.

In 1965, Khoo succeeded Ernest Steven Monteiro as the professor of clinical medicine, and pushed for the establishment of a S$4 million institute for medical specialties at the University of Singapore.

In the 1960s, Khoo witnessed many deaths due to kidney disease, including his younger brother, Oon Eng, who died in 1959 due to kidney failure. After returning from an extensive study trip across United Kingdom, United States and Europe in 1967, Khoo urged the government for the establishment of a national foundation to help individuals dying from kidney disease. As such, on 7 April 1969, the National Kidney Foundation was inaugurated by Minister for Health Chua Sian Chin, with Khoo being elected as the founding chairman. President Yusof Ishak was appointed as patron of the foundation, and Ernest Steven Monteiro, Singapore's ambassador to Cambodia, was appointed as the president.

In 1995, Khoo stepped down as chairman after suffering from a stroke.

== Personal life ==
Khoo was a Methodist.

On 29 August 1947, Khoo married Adeline Phoa at Wesley Methodist Church, Singapore, and they had four sons. Phoa died on 3 April 1996.

In 1995, Khoo suffered from a stroke and had a failed operation to remove a cyst in his brain. He had been in ill health and unable to walk since then. In February 2012, Khoo suffered from epileptic seizures and organ failure.

Khoo died at 1:30 am SST on 5 March 2012, aged 90, at Singapore General Hospital. His good class bungalow at Caldecott Hill was put up for sale by his estate on 15 August 2012, and was sold for S$26.1 million on 30 October 2012.

== Awards and decorations ==
- Public Service Star, in 1987.
