= Lim Chor Pee =

Lim Chor Pee (1936 - 5 December 2006) was a lawyer and playwright. He was a pioneer of English-language theatre in Singapore, and is considered to be Singapore's first English-language playwright.

== Early life and education ==
Lim was born in Penang in 1936. He attended the Penang Free School in 1940s. He studied at St. John's College, Cambridge in the 1950s. He was called to the Bar at the Inner Temple in June 1959. In September 1962, he was admitted to the Malayan Bar in Singapore.

== Career ==
He founded the Experimental Theatre Club in the 1960s to encourage English-educated playwrights by staging their plays. He also served as the company's artistic director 1961 to 1967.

He wrote his first play, Mimi Fan, in 1962. The play featured characters that did not speak Queen's English. His second play, A White Rose at Midnight, was written by 1964. Both plays were staged at the Cultural Centre Theatre by Experimental Theatre Club. He was not satisfied with his third and final play, which was not staged. By then, he had begun to lose interest in drama. He established his own law firm, Chor Pee & Hin Hiong, in 1964. In the same year, he contributed two articles to the literary journal Tumasek. Chor Pee & Hin Hiong later dissolved, and he established Chor Pee and Company, another law firm. It later became Chor Pee & Partners. As a litigator, he handled several high-profile cases, such as the Jumabhoy family feud over family assets.

== Personal life and death ==
Lim was married and had three children.

He died of cancer on 5 December 2006.
