= Water Wally =

Mascot of Singapore Public Ultilities Board

Water Wally, mascot of Public Utilities Board

Water Wally is the official Singapore Public Utilities Board (PUB) mascot. Water Wally is blue in colour and shaped like a water droplet. Water Wally conveys messages about water conservation and usage to the public.

== Mascot unveiling ==
Water Wally was unveiled on 4 August 2005 by Dr Yaacob Ibrahim, Minister for the Environment and Water Resources at an official launch held at MacRitchie Reservoir.

In a two-week "teaser" campaign leading up to the official unveiling, thirty three-metre-high Water Wally inflatable balloons were displayed suspended above various reservoirs and canals around Singapore. A "Where's Wally"-inspired contest to spot the mascot was publicized in national newspapers, receiving over two thousand SMS and email entries. Five of the inflatables were reported as having gone missing during the campaign.

== Water Wally as a publicity tool ==
Singapore's Public Utilities Board (PUB) aims for Water Wally to put a "face" to water management issues which the public, and children in particular, can relate to. Water Wally is prominent in a wide range of PUB publicity materials and souvenirs, including toys, T-shirts, calendars and posters.

At the 2007 Singapore National Day Parade (NDP), Water Wally was featured in 5 different commemorative NEWater bottle designs and tattoos included in the free NDP fun pack given to all attendants. The mascot also makes appearances at talks in schools and libraries.

== Television series ==
The Adventures of Water Wally is a nine-episode short non-dialogue animated series featuring Water Wally titled "The Adventures of Water Wally". It was produced by Scrawl Studios Pte. Ltd in Singapore and Media Development Authority of Singapore (now Infocomm Media Development Authority). There is no dialogue. The show was telecast on MediaCorp's okto channel from 23 January to 14 February 2009, also made available online at www.pub.gov.sg/waterwally.
