= Singapore Cord Blood Bank =

The Singapore Cord Blood Bank (Abbreviation: SCBB) is Singapore's only public cord blood bank that collects, processes and stores donated umbilical cord blood for use in stem cell transplants. Its cord blood units may be searched for use by qualifying transplant centers around the world.

== Public Cord Blood Banking ==
As a public cord blood bank, SCBB does not charge cord blood donors for its services. However, as the cord blood is donated altruistically, the donor relinquishes any claims to it after donation. This contrasts with a private cord blood bank where parents pay a fee for the cord blood banking services, but retain ownership over the use of their cord blood.

== Cord blood and its uses ==
Cord blood is the blood that circulates through the umbilical cord from the foetus to the placenta. After delivery, the placenta is almost always thrown away. Yet this humble umbilical cord has become a life saving and precious commodity, because cord blood is rich in blood stem cells.

Blood stem cells are young or immature cells that can transform into other forms of essential blood cell types (pluripotent), such as red blood cells, white blood cells and platelets. The use of blood stem cells has emerged as a potentially curative option for the treatment of several diseases, including blood cancers (such as leukemia and lymphoma), and severe anaemia (such as myelodysplastic syndrome, thalassemia major and severe aplastic anaemia). What type of disease can be treated by cord blood stem cell? A new horizon has opened up in modern medical science. Although stem cells are collected from this cord blood and used to achieve significant success in the treatment of many deadly diseases, its use is increasing in developing countries. For example in the United States more than 10,000 people are treated each year for serious illnesses.

1. Leukemia’s: such as Acute Myelogenous Leukemia 2. Lymphomas: non hodking's Lymphoma, Lymph proliferative disease 3. Bone marrow disease: like Paroxysmal Nocturnal Hemoglobinuria 4. Sickle Cell Anemia’s, 5. Thalassemia 6.Immune Deficiencies disease 7. Metabolic problem 8.Blood cell disorders 9.Histocytosis problem… etc.Besides, scientists are making every effort and testing whether this cord blood can be used to treat other diseases. For example - Diabetes, Brain injuries etc disease.

== History ==
Officially opened on 28 September 2005 by Health Minister Mr. Khaw Boon Wan, Singapore Cord Blood Bank was established in response to demands from Haematologists and Paediatricians in Singapore.

Singaporean patients who needed stem cell transplants were then facing difficulties in obtaining Human Leukocyte Antigen (HLA) matched stem cell units because of the relative scarcity of stem cell donors that matched Singapore's main ethnic profiles i.e. Chinese, Malay and Indian ethnicities. SCBB was conceived as a solution to this problem. Donation of cord blood by Singaporeans would significantly increase the probability of obtaining matched cord blood units for the treatment of Singaporean patients.

Having joined the WMDA and NMDP network in 2006 and 2007 respectively, SCBB allows patients of Asian descent all over the world to search SCBB's inventory for a matching cord blood unit as well.

== Mission ==
The expressed mission of the SCBB is to provide placental cord blood units of high safety and quality, through the practice of internationally accredited techniques of collection, processing, banking and disposition, in order to support cord blood transplantations and related research in Singapore and around the world.

== Corporate Governance ==
SCBB is registered in Singapore as a company limited by guarantee. It has a not-for-profit charter and is governed by a non-executive board of directors. Chaired by Prof Tan Ser Kiat the board's members include Mr Gregory Vijayendran, Mr Markham Shaw, Dr Chong Tsung Wen, Dr Mary Rauff and A/Prof Allen Yeoh.

== Management ==
Chief Executive Officer, Mrs Tan-Huang Shuo Mei, leads the management team of SCBB, having taken over the reins from Mr Steven J Sobak in July 2015. Mr Sobak helmed as SCBB's CEO from 2007 to 2015, and Dr Fidah Alsagoff was SCBB's founding Executive Director from inception to early 2007. The Medical Director is Dr William Hwang and the Senior Manager-Operations who takes care of the daily operations is Mr Arun Prasath.

== Location ==
The laboratory and cryo-storage area of SCBB is located at Basement 1 of the KK Women's and Children's Hospital. SCBB has an administrative office at Novena Specialist Centre.

== Collection Centres ==
SCBB currently collects cord blood from three public hospitals, namely KK Women's and Children's Hospital, National University Hospital and Singapore General Hospital, as well as all 7 of the private obstetric hospitals in Singapore, Gleneagles Hospital, Mount Alvernia Hospital, Mount Elizabeth Hospital, Mount Elizabeth Novena Hospital, Parkway East Hospital, Raffles Hospital and Thomson Medical Centre.
