= Design, Build and Sell Scheme =

Housing scheme in Singapore

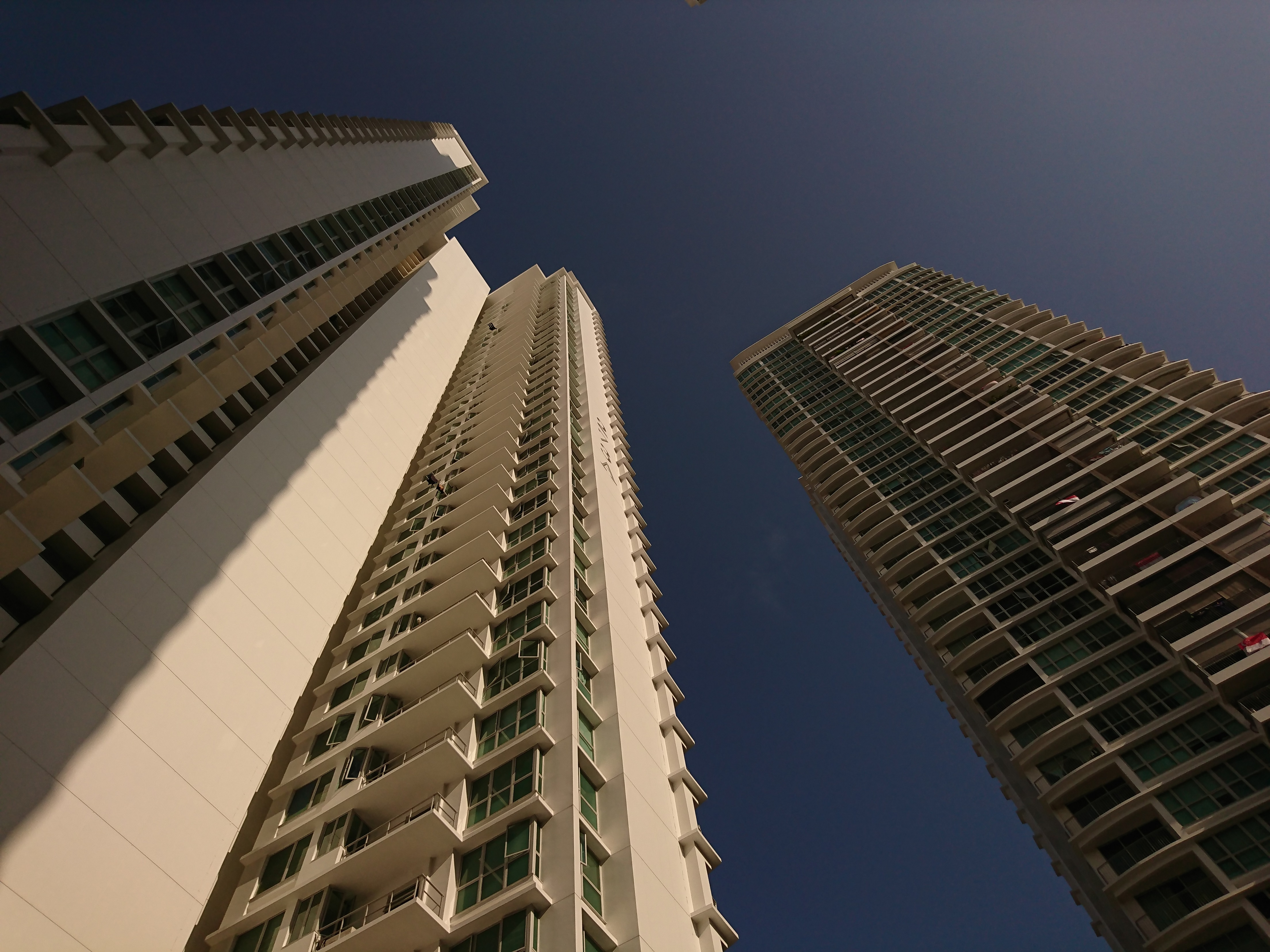
Natura Loft DBSS flats at Bishan.

The Design, Build and Sell Scheme (abbreviation: DBSS) was introduced by the Housing and Development Board in 2005. Flats built under the scheme were meant for public housing and built by private developers. They were built with supposedly better designs and mostly in matured estates such as Tampines, Ang Mo Kio and Bishan. There were 13 DBSS projects, totaling 8,533 units. The scheme attracted public outrage when a series of five-room DBSS flats developed in Tampines by Sim Lian Group Limited opened for sale at S$880,000, significantly more expensive than most middle-class families could afford. As HDB did not control the pricing of DBSS units being sold, the scheme was poorly received and subsequently suspended indefinitely.

== List of DBSS projects ==
Location	DBSS Alias	Blk / Unit no	Launched Completion	Room Layout Design Types	Units sqm Price Range (SGD)	Land Sale / DBSS Awarded (SGD)	DBSS Awarded
Tampines	The Premiere; Pilot DBSS	Eight 17-storey blocks 2–80 @ even number	Oct 2006; Jan 2009	2-room 2-types 4-room 2-types 5-room 10-types	4 (50 m²) $138,000 – $160,000; 36 (92–95 m²) $278,000 – $410,000; 576 (105–114 m²) $308,000 – $450,000	18 January 2006; 21,000 sq m @ $82.2 million	Sim Lian Land Pte Ltd
Boon Keng	City View Press Release	Three 40-storey blocks Blk 7 Unit no 130 – 140 @ even no Blk 8 Unit no 142 – 152 @ even no Blk 9 Unit no 154 – 164 @ even no	Jan 2008; Apr 2011	3-room 2-types 4-room 2-types 5-room 6-types	72 (68 – 70 m²) $349,000 – $394,000; 168 (94–95 m²) $523,000 – $597,000; 474 (107–119 m²) $536,000 – $727,000	6 June 2007; 18,394 sq m @ $170.2 million	Hoi Hup Realty Pte Ltd Sunway Concrete Products (S) Pte Ltd Oriental Worldwide Investments Inc
Ang Mo Kio	Park Central; Press Release	Four 30-storey blocks Blk A, B, C, D	July 2008; Oct 2011	4-room 3-types 5-room 6-types	172 (90–93 m²) $433,000 – $567,000; 406 (112–120 m²) $534,000 – $689,000	5 December 2007; 16,789.1 sq m @ $134.2 million	Greatearth Developments Pte Ltd
Bishan	Natura Loft; Press Release	Three 40-storey blocks Blk 273A, 273B, 275A	Nov 2008; Feb 2012	4-room 2-types 5-room 4-types	160 (95 m²) $465,000 – $586,000; 400 (120 m²) $600,000 – $739,000	28 February 2008; 15,218.5 sq m @ $135.9 million	Qingjian Realty Pte Ltd
Simei	Parc Lumiere; Press Release	Eight 12-storey blocks	Apr 2009; Jul 2011	4-room 4-types 5-room 8-types	120 (94 m²) $378,000 – $425,000; 240 (107–111 m²) $462,000 – $575,000	6 June 2008; 16,825.5 sq m @ $52 million	Sim Lian Land Pte Ltd
Toa Payoh	The Peak; Press Release	Two 42-storey blocks Blk 138A, 139B; Three 40-storey blocks Blk 138B, 138C, 139A	Apr 2009; Jul 2012	3-room 2-types 4-room 1-type 5-room 5-types	42 (70 m²) $355,000 – $398,000; 306 (91 m²) $468,000 – $582,000; 830 (110–117 m²) $539,000 – $722,000	22 August 2008; 27,479.90 sq m @ $198.8 million	Hoi Hup Realty Pte Ltd Sunway Developments Pte Ltd Hoi Hup JV Development Pte Ltd
Yishun	Adora Green; Press Release	Six 16-storey blocks 347A - B, 348A - D	Feb 2011	3-room 2-types 4-room 2-types 5-room 2-types	67 m² ~ $300,000 – $400,000; 92 m² ~ $400,000 – $500,000; 112 m² ~ $500,000 – $600,000	24 May 2010; 27,473.70 sq m @ $148.9 million	Guthrie (DBP) Pte Ltd SK Land Pte Ltd
Tampines	Centrale 8 Press Release	One 15-storey block Blk 519A; Six 16-storey blocks Blk 519B - D, 520A - C	Jun 2011	3-room 4-types 4-room 3-types 5-room 3-types	182 (61 – 62 m²) $389,000 – $445,000; 348 (83 – 84 m²) $511,000 – $592,000; 178 (108 – 109 m²) $685,000 - $778,000	6 August 2010; 21,131.70 sq m @ $178.1 million	Sim Lian Land Pte Ltd
Bedok	Bedok Belvia Press Release	Three 14-storey blocks Three 15-storey blocks	Oct 2011; 2014	3-room 2-types 4-room 3-types 5-room 3-types	102 (66 – 67 m²) $387,000 – $415,000; 207 (85–87 m²) $494,000 – $576,000; 177 (105–109 m²) $648,000 – $727,000	4 November 2010; 16,668 sq m @ $112.7 million	CEL Development
Upper Serangoon (Hougang)	Parkland Residences Press Release	Four 18-storey blocks 475A - D	Jan 2012	3-room 2-types 4-room 2-types 5-room 3-types	136 (67 m²); 272 (92 m²); 272 (109–112 m²)	2 December 2010; 20,000 sq m @ $$155.2 million	Kwan Hwee Investment Pte Ltd
Yuan Ching Road (Jurong West)	Lake Vista Press Release	Four 22-storey blocks 138A - D	Oct 2011; 2015	3-room 1-type 4-room 3-types 5-room 4-types	67 m² $360,500 – $399,500; 86–91 m² $481,000 – $575,300; 105–108 m² $584,300 – $680,400	10 January 2011; 21,199.7 sq m @ $131.6 million	Hoi Hup Realty Pte Ltd Sunway Developments Pte Ltd SC Wong Holdings Pte Ltd
Clementi	Trivelis Press Release	Three 40-storey blocks	Oct 2011; 2015	3-room 4-types 4-room 8-types 5-room 3-types	60m² $375,000 – $470,000; 80–82 m² $530,000 – $650,000; 105m² $658,000 – $770,000	10 March 2011; 21,906.5 sq m @ $224 million	EL Development Pte Ltd
