= Defense blood standard system =

US medical military information system

The Defense Blood Standard System (DBSS) is a FDA-regulated, Class II Medical Device designed to handle blood collection, processing and tracking procedures, and automation of standards and safeguards for the Military Health System (MHS) blood supply. It is identified by the FDA as a Blood Establishment Software item.

The DBSS supports the Armed Services Blood Program Office, which manages the blood program for the Department of Defense, and services more than 8.7 million MHS beneficiaries.
