= Chen Jin Lang =

Singapore singer and songwriter

- Born: 陈忠诚; February 12, 1961; Singapore
- Died: July 25, 2006 (aged 45); Singapore
- Occupations: Host, Songwriter
- Years active: 1977 - 2006

Chen Jin Lang (Chinese: 陈金浪; pinyin: Chén Jīn Làng; 12 February 1961– 25 July 2006) was a Singapore 'getai' songwriter legend and King of Hokkien pop.

== Personal life ==
Chen Jin Lang became a nightclub singer at age 9 to supplement the family income. At 16, he released his first Hokkien album. He has released more than 80 Hokkien and Mandarin albums in his 36-year career.

He is regarded as the king of Hokkien pop in Singapore.

He used to be a host at least 20 getai shows and sang at about 80 during the annual Hungry Ghost Festival. He was also a bachelor, and a bankrupt.

In 2004, he filed for bankruptcy after his business - producing shows for Taiwanese stars - went bust. He was jailed in 2005 for four months for leaving Singapore without permission despite being a bankrupt. He was released in March for good behaviour. Returning to entertainment, he drew 10,000 fans to two sold-out shows. He was diagnosed with fourth-stage colon cancer in 2005, but he continued to perform to pay for his medical bills.

He died of colon cancer on 25 July 2006, which is coincidentally the 1st day of the seventh lunar month, believed by the Chinese as the month of the Hungry Ghost Festival.
