= Boon Keng =

- Subzone of Kallang Planning Area

Other transcription(s)
  - Chinese: 文庆
  - Pinyin: Wén'qìng
  - Hokkien POJ: Bûn-khèng
  - Tamil: பூன் கெங்
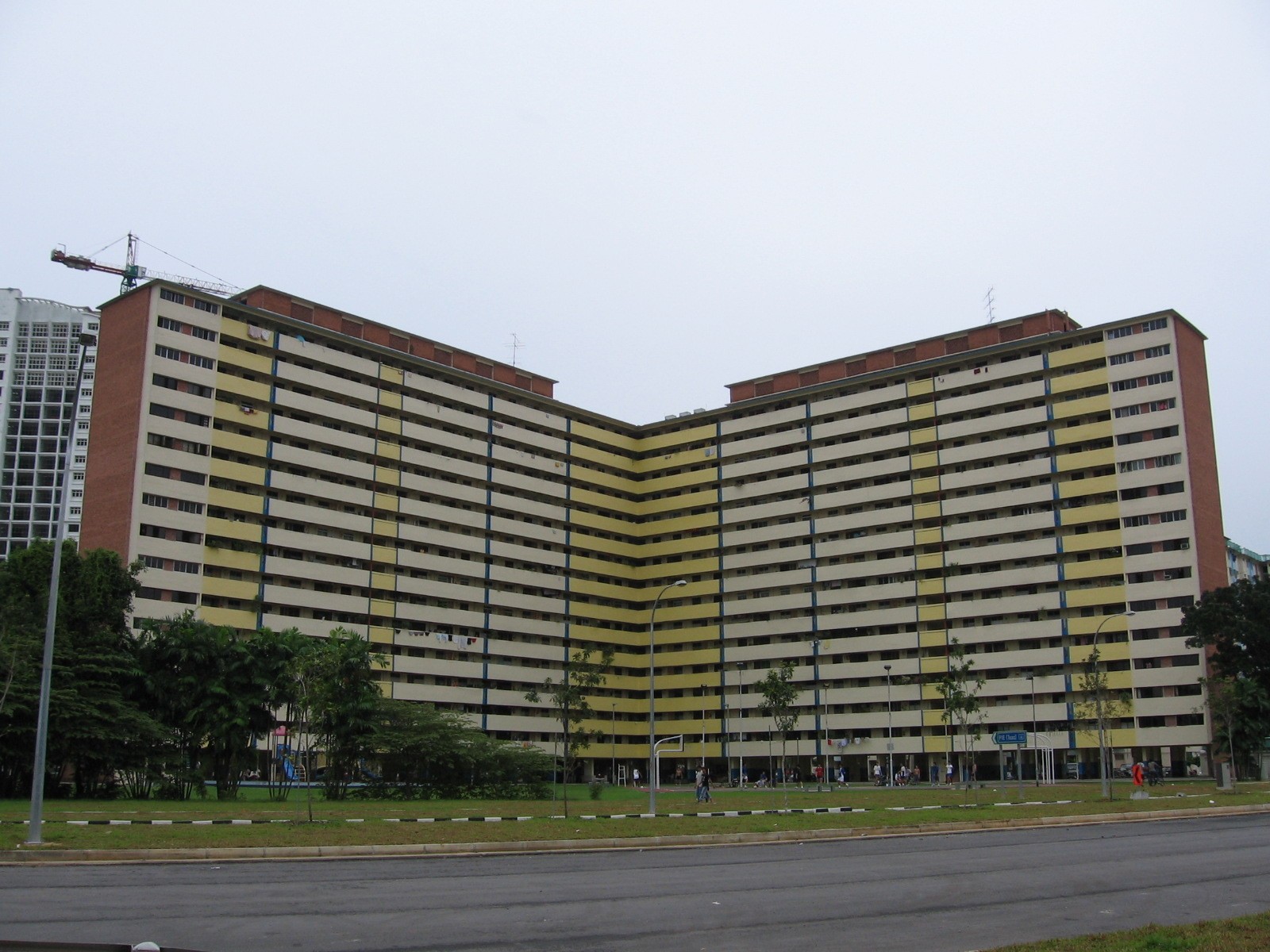
- Housing estate in Boon Keng

- Location of Boon Keng in Singapore
- Coordinates: 1°18′56.06″N 103°52′23.61″E
- Country: Singapore
- Region: Central Region
- Planning Area: Kallang

Area
  - Total: 0.41 km^{2} (0.16 sq mi)

Population (2015)
  - Total: 10,970
  - Density: 27,000/km^{2} (69,000/sq mi)

Boon Keng (Chinese: 文庆, Tamil: பூன் கெங்) is a subzone within the planning area of Kallang, Singapore, as defined by the Urban Redevelopment Authority (URA). The smallest in terms of physical area among the nine subzones that make up Kallang, Boon Keng is bounded by the Pelton Canal in the north; the Kallang–Paya Lebar Expressway (KPE) and Sims Way in the east; Sims Avenue in the south; and the Kallang River in the west.

Primarily a prime residential area, this area is served by Boon Keng MRT station along the North East Line and Kallang MRT station along the East–West Line. Geylang West Community Club is located within this subzone.

This area took its name from Dr Lim Boon Keng, a prominent figure in Singapore history.

== See also ==
- Lim Boon Keng
