= Buangkok MRT station =

Mass Rapid Transit station in Singapore

Buangkok NE15 万国 புவாங்கோக்
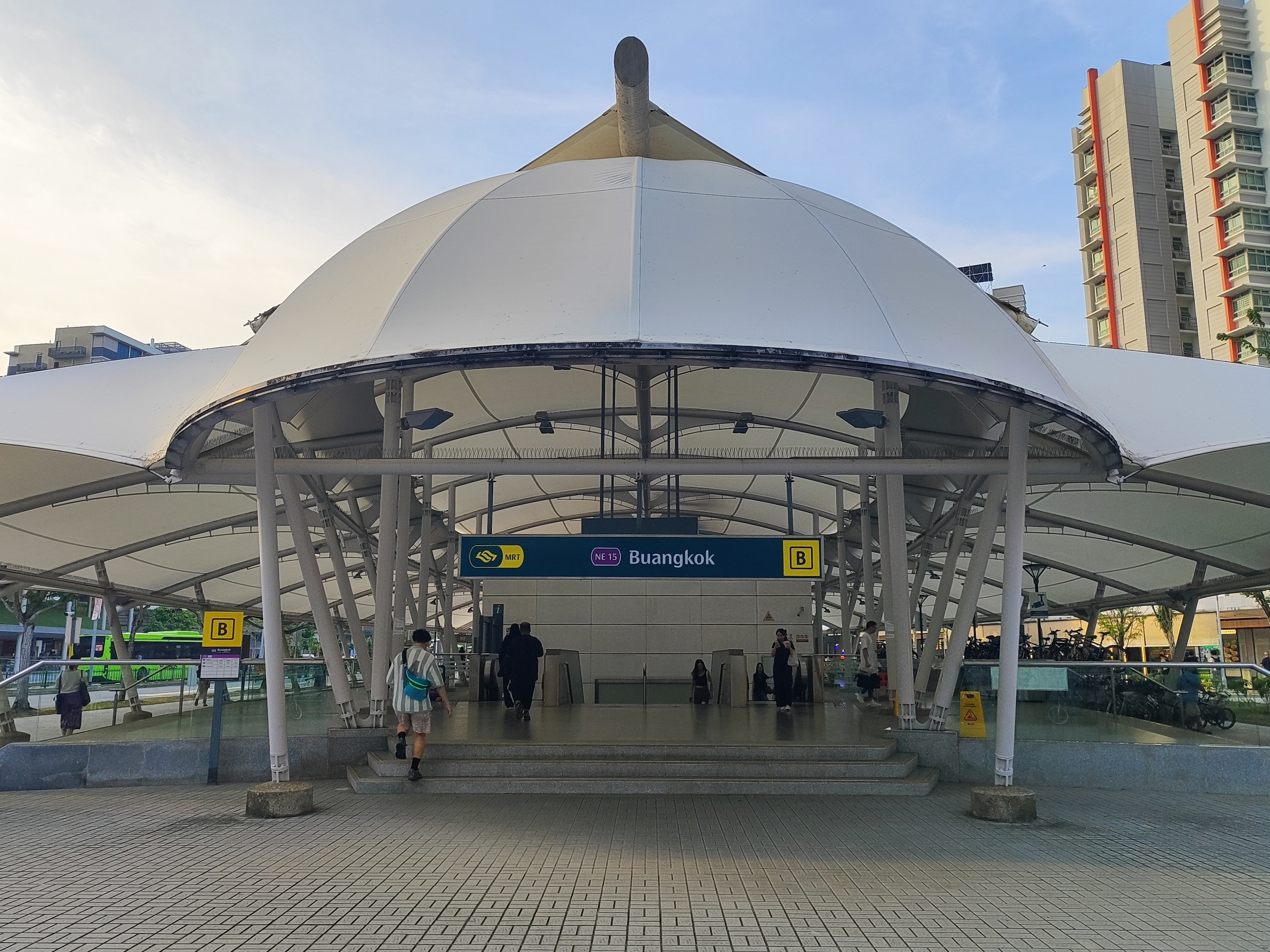
- Exit B of Buangkok station

General information
- Location: 10 Sengkang Central, Singapore 545061
- Coordinates: 01°22′58″N 103°53′35″E
- System: Mass Rapid Transit (MRT) station
- Owner: Land Transport Authority
- Operator: SBS Transit
- Line: North East Line
- Platforms: 2 (1 island platform)
- Connections: Buangkok, taxi

Construction
- Structure type: Underground
- Platform levels: 2
- Accessible: Yes

History
- Opened: 15 January 2006; 20 years ago

Passengers
- June 2024: 19,010 per day

Services
Preceding station	Mass Rapid Transit	Following station
Hougang towards HarbourFront	North East Line	Sengkang towards Punggol Coast
Track layout
Location
- Location within Singapore Rail

Buangkok MRT station is an underground Mass Rapid Transit (MRT) station on the North East Line (NEL) in Singapore. It is located near the road intersection of Sengkang Central and Compassvale Bow. The station serves the residential neighbourhood of Buangkok and surrounding developments including Buangkok Bus Interchange, Sengkang Grand Residence, and Sengkang Grand Mall.

The station was first announced in March 1996 and construction began in April 1997. Although the NEL began operations on 20 June 2003, Buangkok station remained closed due to its low projected ridership, prompting dissatisfaction among nearby residents. Despite lobbying by grassroots leaders, the government supported SBS Transit's decision, arguing that a premature opening would have made the station a "white elephant". During a visit by Youth Minister Vivian Balakrishnan to Punggol South in August 2005, eight white cardboard elephants were put up in protest. A police investigation into the incident ended with a stern warning to a grassroots leader. Following a re-evaluation of passenger demand by the Land Transport Authority, the station opened on 15 January 2006.

Operated by SBS Transit, Buangkok station is wheelchair-accessible and has been designated as a civil defence shelter. The station's design, by Altoon + Porter Architects and 3HP Architects, features white Teflon sheets covering the station's entrances. Water, Nature & Contemporary – an Art-in-Transit artwork by Vincent Leow – is displayed at the station.

== History ==
=== Construction ===
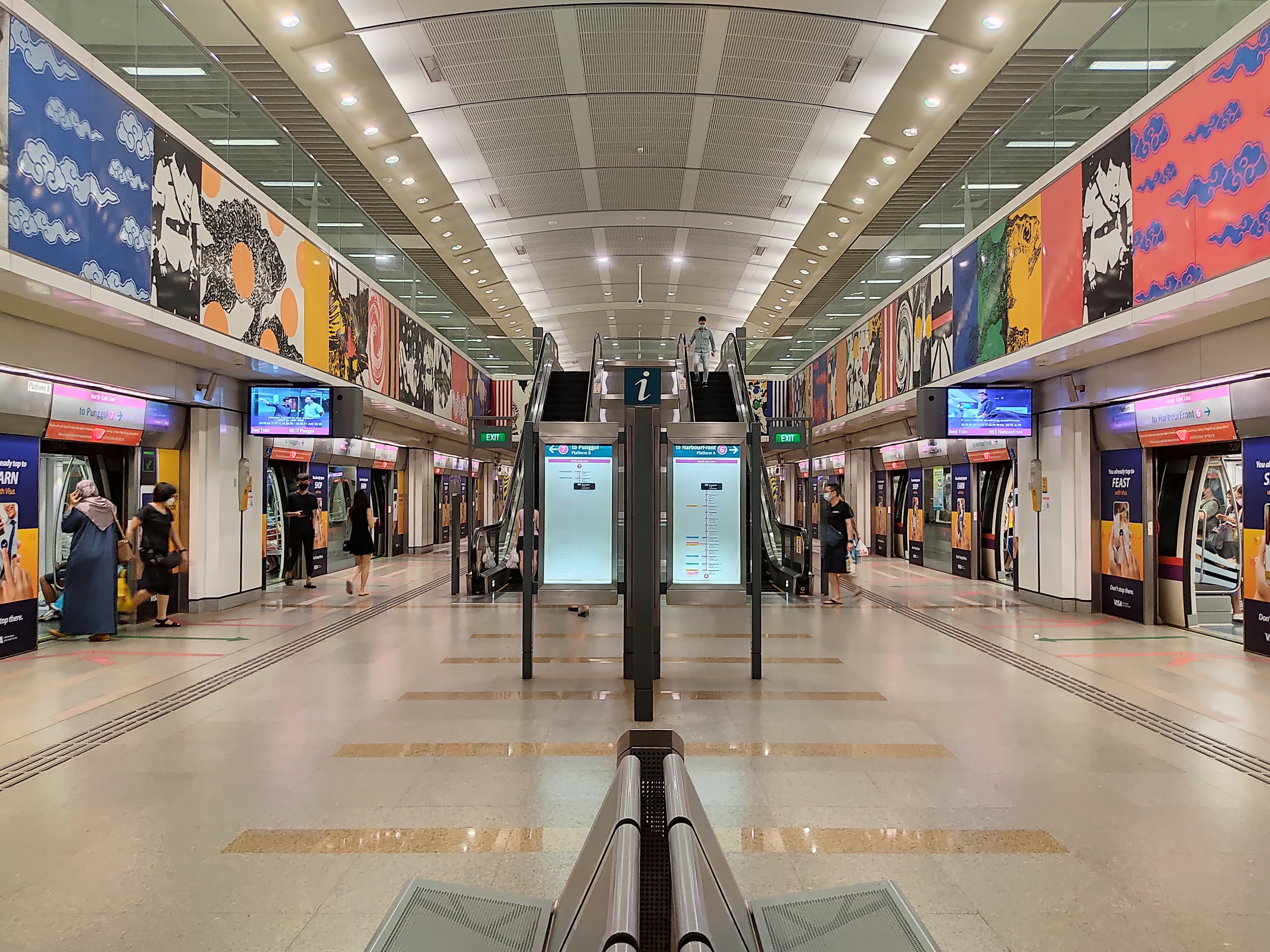
Station platforms

The North East Line (NEL) Mass Rapid Transit (MRT) project was first proposed by the government of Singapore in 1984, and a decision to proceed with the project was made in January 1996. Buangkok station was one of sixteen planned NEL stations announced in March 1996 by Communications Minister Mah Bow Tan. The Land Transport Authority (LTA) stated that the NEL segment including Buangkok station might be ready before 2002.

The contract for the construction of Sengkang and Buangkok stations was awarded to a joint venture between Sato Kogyo Company and Hock Lian Seng Engineering on 26 April 1997. The S$166.38 million (US$112.1 million) contract included the construction of 1.6 km (0.99 mi) of connecting tunnels between the stations and 1.2 kilometres (0.75 mi) of reception tunnels to Sengkang Depot.

Buangkok station was built in a largely forested area earmarked for redevelopment into a new town. After the forest was cleared and the vacated warehouses around the site were demolished, the site was excavated to a depth of as much as 20 m (66 ft), and work on the station proceeded. Once construction was complete, new roads were built to connect the station to the road system.

=== Delay in opening ===
Three days before the NEL's planned opening, on 17 June 2003, the line's operator SBS Transit announced that Woodleigh and Buangkok stations would remain closed due to the lack of development in their surrounding areas. Housing demand had declined due to the 1997 Asian financial crisis and the global economic downturn following the September 11 attacks. Consequently, the Housing and Development Board (HDB) had reduced its development plans in the north-east of Singapore. SBS Transit said that keeping the stations closed would reduce annual operating costs by S$2 to 3 million, and that the station would need a daily ridership of 5,000 to be commercially viable. (Note: SBS Transit also acknowledged that ridership at some other NEL stations had yet to reach that figure. In August 2003, the average daily ridership was 160,000, which was lower than the expected figure of around 250,000.) The company apologised for the short notice, explaining that the decision had been made in May after the fare structure for the NEL was approved at levels lower than they had proposed.

Residents around the station were dissatisfied by the sudden decision; grassroots leaders had previously assured them the station would open. Charles Chong, a Member of Parliament for Pasir Ris–Punggol Group Representation Constituency, echoed the residents' sentiments. A poll of residents living within 700 m (2,300 ft) of the station showed that nearly 7 in 10 were willing to walk there, contrary to SBS Transit's claim that few commuters would be willing to walk more than 400 metres (1,300 ft). (Note: SBS Transit argued there was little residential development within walking distance of the station, claiming the nearest housing was about 450 metres (1,480 ft) away and only seven residential blocks within 600 metres (2,000 ft) to the south. The operator also said that nearby residents could instead use buses to reach Hougang station. However, the survey found 64 residential blocks within 600 metres (2,000 ft) of the station, including 30 within SBS Transit's own walking-distance criterion. The nearest flats were only 380 metres (1,250 ft) from the station.) Residents polled also said it would be more convenient for them to use Buangkok station than the adjacent stations at Sengkang and Hougang. However, SBS Transit argued that the poll was flawed and did not take into account how often commuters would be willing to walk such a distance. (Note: The poll was launched by Chong and conducted by Muhammad Faishal from the National University of Singapore (NUS).)

In July 2003, Transport Minister Yeo Cheow Tong denied the station was a "white elephant", saying it would open once the area had been developed. (Note: A white elephant is an idiom for impractical possessions that are expensive to maintain but cannot be disposed of.) He also defended the opening of low-ridership stations such as Clarke Quay and Expo, arguing that they would become viable in time. During a parliamentary debate in August, the government acknowledged SBS Transit had made mistakes in delaying the announcement, but supported the company's decision and rationale due to low passenger demand in the area. At the official opening ceremony of the NEL on 28 August 2003, Deputy Prime Minister Lee Hsien Loong said Buangkok station would open in 2006 after more flats were built in the area. In the meantime, the government planned to provide more feeder bus services for local residents. In response to residents' plans to gift SBS Transit a white-elephant statue, Lee said that Buangkok station would be a "bigger white elephant" if it were to serve no passengers after its opening.

Chong and other grassroots leaders launched another survey in 2005, interviewing 495 residents near Punggol station. This survey found 65% of the respondents who lived within 400 m (1,300 ft) of the station walked there seven times a week. SBS Transit, however, argued the poll did not show whether enough people would undertake the daily walk to Buangkok station, maintaining that it would be cheaper for residents to use Hougang station. In response to the poll, Yeo suggested that the Land Transport Authority (LTA) might expand the catchment radius from 400 m (1,300 ft) to 500 m (1,600 ft). At the time, there were about 2,300 homes within 500 m (1,600 ft) of Buangkok station.

=== White elephant incident ===
When travelling to Punggol South on 28 August 2005, youth minister Vivian Balakrishnan saw that eight white cardboard elephants had been erected along the road toward Buangkok station. This prompted the minister to visit the unopened station. In a discussion with the residents, he said the station's opening would be a "matter of time" following the construction of the 2,000 residential units. After the minister's visit, the elephant cut-outs were removed. Chong attributed the residents' renewed dissatisfaction to higher transport costs and frustration that the completed station remained closed while they had to travel farther to use another station.

On 1 September, the police launched an investigation into the cut-outs under the Public Entertainment and Meetings Act. Residents and community leaders were shocked at the investigation, saying that there was no ill intent and that the cut-outs were a creative way to bring the issue to the minister. In a letter to The Straits Times, sociologist Chua Beng Huat commented the investigation was "paranoid". He argued that the dispute was fundamentally a municipal issue rather than a national one, criticising the press for failing to distinguish between the two in Singapore's single-tier system of government. Deputy Prime Minister Wong Kan Seng said the investigation was initiated because they could not selectively enforce legislation. The police closed the investigation on 6 October without pressing charges, though they sternly warned one veteran grassroots leader for an infringement of the Act.

=== Station opening ===
Transport minister Yeo requested the LTA to re-examine whether there was adequate passenger demand to justify the station's opening. In September 2005, Yeo said the expected opening date had been further postponed to 2008 following the LTA's projections for the housing development plans for the area; only 500 residential units had been completed within 400 metres (1,300 ft) of the station. The LTA continued to review the feasibility of opening the station sooner. On 11 November 2005, Yeo announced Buangkok station would open the following January after SBS Transit agreed to the expedited opening as financial losses from its rail operations had declined. Ridership on the NEL had also increased to 200,000 in the previous month. Yeo denied pressuring the operator to open the station and said the opening was due to "tireless appeals" by Chong. In December, the opening date was scheduled for 15 January. Before the opening, SBS Transit staff tested the station's equipment and had the station cleaned.

"Save the White Elephants" T-shirt design by students from Raffles Girls' School.

Following the incident, students from Raffles Girls' School (RGS) formed a group called "Project White Elephant" that was aimed at encouraging youth to take an active role in politics. T-shirts bearing the words "Save the White Elephants" were created and sold to raise funds for a charity, Youth Guidance. Punggol South grassroots leaders invited RGS students to sell their remaining "Save the White Elephants" T-shirts at the carnival for the station's opening event. During the preparations for the carnival, the police sent an advisory to the students and carnival organisers, saying a fund-raising permit was required for them to sell the shirts and warning the organisers "wearing the T-shirts en masse may be misconstrued by some as an offence under the Miscellaneous Offences (Public & Order & Nuisance) (Assemblies & Processions) Rules". They also said that they would make an exception to process the fund-raising permit in time for the event. No one, including the girls selling them, wore the shirts at the station's opening, and the celebrations proceeded without issues. Wong later apologised for the police's overreaction to the incident.

SBS Transit reported that the station opened as scheduled "amid great fanfare". The ceremony began with a walk-a-jog to the station, led by the event's guest-of-honour, Defence Minister Teo Chee Hean; this was followed by a ribbon-cutting ceremony. Station operations began at 12:55 pm. After its opening, the station averaged 1,386 daily riders instead of the expected 6,000. Many residents still travelled to the adjacent Sengkang and Hougang stations due to the retail and commercial amenities there. SBS Transit, after saying it was still "too early to draw a conclusion" about the station's ridership, remained committed to keeping the station open to serve future developments nearby.

Daily ridership for the station increased to 7,000 in 2009. By 2010, the nearby population had increased with new developments, overcoming the earlier problem of low population density around the station. The number of HDB blocks in the surrounding area rose from fewer than 100 to 149. When Buangkok Bus Interchange opened in 2024, residents interviewed by Lianhe Zaobao said that Buangkok had transformed from a "white elephant" (白象) to a "golden elephant" (金象), citing improved transport accessibility and rising property values in the area.

== Details ==
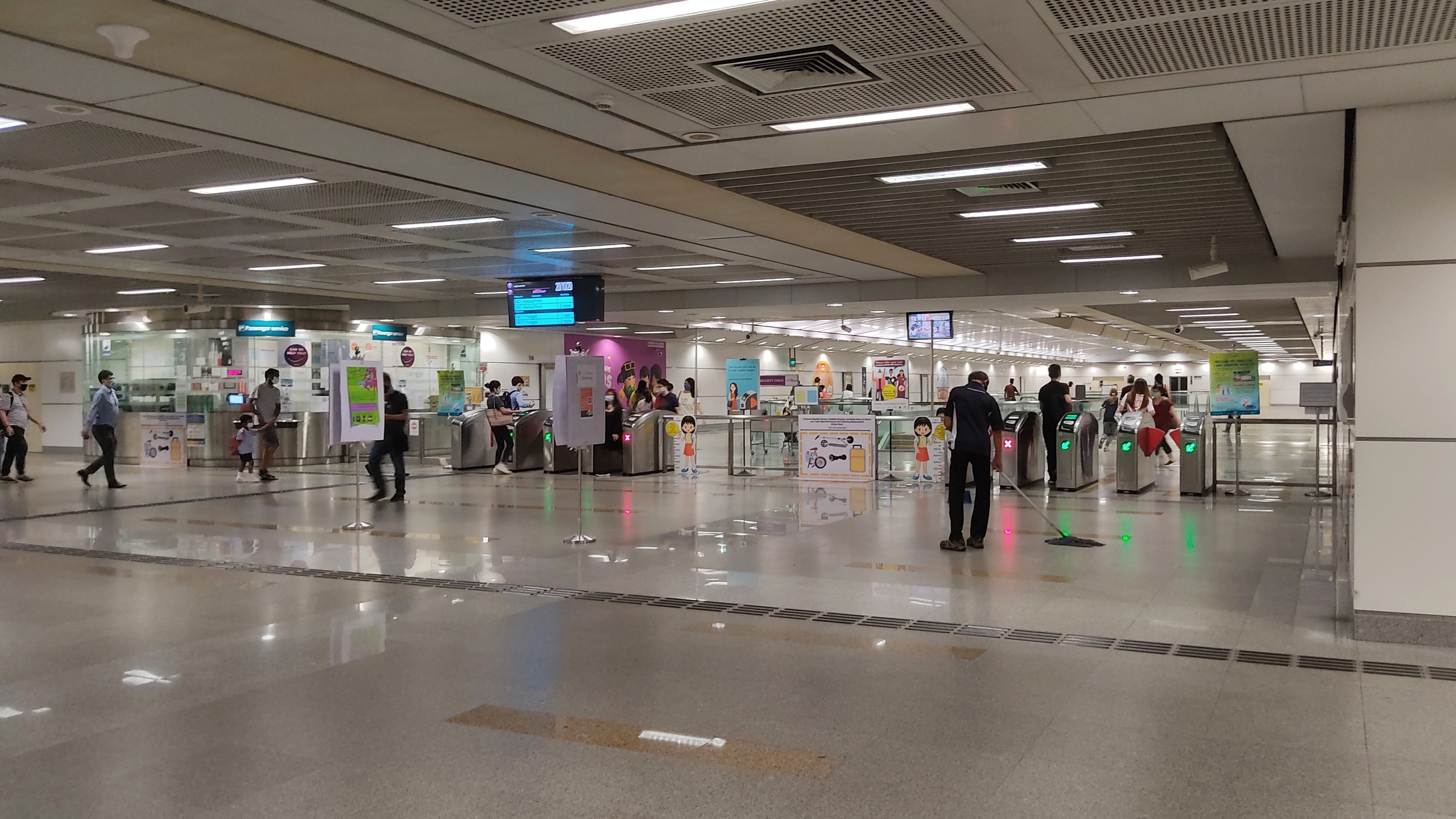
Concourse level of the station

Buangkok station, which bears the station code of NE15, serves the North East Line (NEL) of the Mass Rapid Transit (MRT) and is located between Hougang and Sengkang stations. Buangkok station is operated by SBS Transit, and train frequencies vary from 2.5 to 5.75 minutes.

Buangkok (万国) is the Teochew name of the former Singapore United Rubber Plantation, which the neighbourhood and station are named after. Buangkok station is located in Sengkang along the road of Sengkang Central near the junction with Compassvale Bow. The station has two entrances and taxi stands along each side of Sengkang Central. Developments around the station include HDB flats, and Palm View Primary School and North Vista Primary School. The station serves Sengkang Grand Residences, an integrated commercial and residential development that includes Sengkang Grand Mall and Buangkok Bus Interchange. The bus interchange opened on 1 December 2024.

Altoon + Porter Architects and 3HP Architects designed the station, which is underground. Unlike other NEL stations, glass was not used in the design of the station entrances; white Teflon sheets, supported by metal frames, instead covered the entrances, resembling a circus tent. Like all other MRT stations, the platforms are wheelchair accessible. A tactile system, consisting of tiles with rounded or elongated raised studs, guides visually impaired commuters through the station. Dedicated tactile routes connect the station entrances to the platforms.

Buangkok station is designated as a Civil Defence (CD) shelter; it is designed to accommodate around 7,500 people, withstand airstrikes, and remove toxic air. Equipment essential for the operations in the CD shelter is mounted on shock absorbers to prevent damage during a bombing. If the electrical supply to the shelter is disrupted, backup generators allow operations to continue. The shelter has dedicated built-in decontamination chambers and dry toilets with collection bins that are designed to send human waste out of the shelter.

=== Artwork ===
External image
- Water, Nature & Contemporary | LTA Art in Transit (via Bloomberg Connects)

The artwork Water, Nature & Contemporary by Vincent Leow is displayed at Buangkok station as part of the Art-in-Transit programme, a showcase of public artworks on the MRT network. It consists of two strips of images displayed across the staircase voids of the station concourse. These black-and-white photographs are silkscreened on vitreous enamel panels, reminiscent of cinematic stills and film strips. Through the use of primary colours and colourful embellishments of dots, graphic motifs, and bands, Leow intended to capture commuters' attention while creating "a bright and happy ambience". Also incorporated in the artwork are auspicious symbols, including depictions of fishes and red-or-tangerine clouds. The clouds are inspired by traditional Chinese art and street theatre.

Leow, who is known for his paintings and sculptures, decided to experiment with fusing art and photography to "push his artistic boundaries". These photographs depict people, activities, and natural landscapes in Singapore. They were retrieved from the National Archives of Singapore and curated by Leow to reflect the lifestyle of old Buangkok and rural Singapore, and to help commuters connect the past with the future. Leow also intended for the images to function as a commentary on life in Singapore; for example, Leow intended a photograph of a soldier on parade to remind Singaporean men of National Service as their "rite of passage into adulthood". The enlargement of the photographs resulted in an abstract appearance when viewed up close; the images come into clear focus when observed from a distance.
