= T. T. Durai =

Singaporean businessman convicted of fraud

- Born: Thambirajah Tharmadurai; 22 April 1948 (age 77)
- Known for: National Kidney Foundation Singapore scandal

Thambirajah Tharmadurai (born 22 April 1948), better known as T. T. Durai, is a Singaporean who formerly served as the chief executive officer (CEO) of the non-profit health organisation National Kidney Foundation Singapore (NKF). The central figure in the 2005 National Kidney Foundation Singapore scandal, he was convicted for fraud, paying $4.5 million in total for services not rendered, and sentenced to a three-month jail term.

== Career ==
Durai worked for Bonyad Marketing Industries, which he said was an Iranian charity, as a representative in Singapore from 1990 to 1992. He left the company after being appointed as NKF's CEO.

Prior to becoming NKF CEO in 1992, Durai had been a volunteer for NKF for 21 years

Durai was also a director of Amcol Holdings between 1990 and 1996, MediaCorp TV Channel 12 and Global Net Relations, a former NKF's employee's company.

On 14 July 2005, Durai and the NKF Board met with Health Minister Khaw Boon Wan. On the same day, the NKF called a press conference to announce the resignations of Durai and the entire NKF Board.

In 2007, Durai was hired as the CEO of a new subsidiary company under Singapore-based real estate management firm Property Facility Services and was based full-time in Abu Dhabi, United Arab Emirates.

== NKF scandal ==
=== Defamation suit against SPH ===
On 19 April 2004, The Straits Times published an editorial "NKF: Controversially ahead of its time?" written by senior correspondent Susan Long. This article led to Durai and NKF challenging the first six lines of the article, which claimed that a retired contractor (who declined to - and cannot - be named, for fear of being sued) had 'lost it' when he was asked to install "a glass-panelled shower, a pricey German toilet bowl and a (S$1,000) gold-plated tap" in Durai's office.

NKF and Durai later served a writ on Long and SPH for defamation, demanding S$3.24 million in damages. They claimed that the article insinuated the mismanagement of donors' funds, the installations were scaled down only due to the contractor's protests, and that it had avoided providing further details on that matter. The trial began on 11 July 2005, with Long and SPH represented by Senior Counsel and MP Davinder Singh, while NKF and Durai were represented by Senior Counsel Michael Khoo. Under cross-examination, it was revealed that Durai collected a monthly salary of $25,000 and collected a 10-month bonus in 2002 and a 12-month bonus in both 2003 and 2004, for a total of $1.8 million over three years. He had access to a fleet of eight chauffeured cars and the NKF paid the maintenance costs of his personal Mercedes-Benz. At the end of the second day of the trial, the case was dropped by Durai.

On 14 July 2005, after a meeting with Health Minister Khaw Boon Wan, Durai and the entire NKF board resigned.

=== Civil suit by NKF ===
In April 2006, law firm Allen & Gledhill was engaged by the new NKF board to investigate past transactions that occurred under the former board and Durai's management. The new board eventually filed a civil lawsuit against Durai, Durai's business associates and three former board members to recover monies amounting to S$12 million in salaries, benefits and failed contracts. The suit included legal fees incurred during the NKF defamation suit against SPH and loss of donations from donors after the scandal.

The suit was heard on 8 January 2007 and on the second day of the trial, Durai conceded to all the claims made by NKF. The suit eventually ended on 13 February 2007.

The suit was settled with Durai repaying NKF $4.05 million, in a lump sum payment and instalments. Through a gift of S$1 million by Charles Letts, a former Jardine Mattheson & Co director, Durai selling his house, and other loans from family and friends, Durai avoided bankruptcy. By July 2011, Durai finished his repayments to NKF.

=== Criminal suit ===
After Durai and the NKF board resigned, the new NKF board appointed audit firm KPMG to audit NKF's transactions when it was managed by Durai. KPMG later released an audit report in December 2005. Based on the report, the Commercial Affairs Department and the Corrupt Practices Investigation Bureau investigated NKF’s malpractices.

On 19 April 2006, Durai was charged for intention to deceive NKF when he approved payments, totaled $25,000, to two companies for services not rendered. On 11 June 2007, Durai was convicted of both charges and sentenced to three months' jail. Durai appealed against the sentence but lost the appeal on 30 May 2008 as the presiding judge, Tay Yong Kwang, said that Durai "was in a position of trust and authority at the NKF and the return of the money only came about after investigations into the invoices were underway." The judge added that the "money in question belonged to a charity whose funds come from well meaning trusting donors".

Durai was jailed on 10 June 2008. After serving two-thirds of the sentence, he was released on 11 August.

Durai was charged on 27 June 2008 for a $5,000 invoice to a recruitment company for finding candidates for a senior management position in NKF. Investigations shown that service was also not rendered but the charge was subsequently dropped.

It was reported in The Straits Times in 2013 that Durai was spared from bankruptcy as a result of the events involving NKF only because of the extension of a goodwill loan from a personal friend.

== Personal life ==
On 16 July 2007, Durai was admitted to National University Hospital after contracting dengue fever. His condition was reportedly stable.

In 2025, his son Dev Ananth Durai was linked to an insider trading probe.
