= National Kidney Foundation Singapore =

Non-profit health organisation in Singapore

- Abbreviation: NKFS
- Formation: 7 April 1969; 57 years ago
- Founder: Khoo Oon Teik
- Type: NPO
- Registration no.: 200104750M
- Headquarters: 81 Kim Keat Road, Singapore 328836
- Location: Singapore
- Coordinates: 1.326725°N 103.854598°E
- Region served: Singapore
- Chairman: Arthur Lang
- CEO: Yen Tan
- Website: http://www.nkfs.org/

The National Kidney Foundation Singapore (NKF) is a non-profit health organisation in Singapore. Its mission is to render services to kidney patients, encourage and promote renal research, as well as to carry out public education programs on kidney diseases. As of February 2016, NKF has 29 dialysis centres in Singapore.

== History ==
=== Early years ===
NKF was founded in the early 1960s, after nephrologist Prof. Khoo Oon Teik witnessed many people suffering from kidney failure, including his own brother, Reverend Khoo Oon Eng. During that time, about 200 Singaporeans were dying each year from kidney failure. As a result, Prof. Khoo was determined to set up a National Kidney Foundation to help needy kidney patients. NKF was inaugurated on 7 April 1969, on World Health Day, by President Yusof Ishak.

In September 1982, NKF officially opened its first dialysis centre at the Kwong Wai Shiu Hospital.

In 1987, NKF built its first satellite dialysis centre, SIA-NKF Dialysis Centre, in Toa Payoh. Singapore Airlines sponsored part of the cost of setting up the centre and operations. It was the first kidney dialysis centre outside of a hospital in Singapore and also possibly the first one in Southeast Asia. It was opened on 24 December.

On 6 October 2001, a new building for NKF's headquarters was commissioned on Kim Keat Road. Singapore Buddhist Welfare Services, Tay Choon Hye, the Shaw Foundation, Singapore Pools and the Lee Foundation contributed a total of $21 million to the cost of building the NKF Centre.

In April 2005, NKF started cancer screening for seven types of cancer, including breast and colon cancer, at a new centre in Cecil Street. The centre, Aviva-NKF Life & Health Hub, was located in a building owned by insurance company Aviva which offered about 10,000 sq ft of space rent-free to the NKF for five years. NKF also announced the establishment of a $20 million cancer fund patient support programme, NKF Cancer Fund, modelled on its dialysis support programme. All cancer patients with a monthly household income of less than $3,500 will be eligible for subsidy consideration. NKF then collaborated with Mediacorp to produce a Chinese drama series, A New Life, starring Christopher Lee and Yvonne Lim, on an ordinary blue-collar worker facing family and friends suffering from various cancers and overcoming it.

=== Scandal and aftermath ===
In July 2005, former CEO T.T Durai and the NKF board directors stepped down due to allegations of mismanagement. A KPMG report commissioned by the new board revealed that the NKF had spent $12 million on the board's salaries, benefits and failed contracts, and was only spending 10% of its donations on dialysis. Durai was convicted of fraud and sentenced to three months in jail, and separately ordered to repay the NKF $4.05 million.

Following a recovery from the scandal, Chairman Gerard Ee, handed over the reins in 2012 to Koh Poh Tiong. In 2013, CEO Eunice Tay retired, and Edmund Kwok took over.

On 16 November 2016, the NKF board held a press conference announcing that Kwok was removed from his position as CEO, due to a police case involving Kwok and a NKF male employee.

== The Children's Kidney Centre ==
In 2002, the Shaw Foundation donated $4 million to open a Children's Kidney Centre at the National University Hospital to support children with kidney diseases.

== Education and prevention ==
Aside from providing dialysis treatment, NKF also focuses on kidney disease education and prevention, against as diabetes and hypertension, which are leading causes of kidney failure.

The Schools Outreach Programme teaches children about kidney functions, kidney failure, and how kidney patients cope with this chronic condition. The program includes visits to the Kidney Discovery Centre at NKF's headquarters; school assembly talks, and health booths at schools; and the Kidney Health Education Bus, which has health screening stations.

The Little Champs and Young Champs Programmes aim to strengthen students’ leadership abilities and inspire them to make a difference to the community and in the lives of kidney patients.

‘Healthy Mondays’ is a programme for adults. Introduced to organisations and corporations, it consists of health talks, health screenings and exercises to nurture healthy lifestyles for employees.

NKF also works with local media, healthcare and social agencies, grass-roots organisations, and institutions to disseminate health messages.

== Providing peritoneal dialysis ==
NKF also promotes Peritoneal Dialysis (PD) allowing kidney patients to have more flexibility and control of their lifestyle, by undergoing treatment at home. To encourage PD and build the confidence of patients undergoing this treatment, the NKF has a Comprehensive PD Community Support Programme where trained and experienced PD nurses work closely with the hospitals to support PD patients at home to help them start and stay well on PD.

== Notable programmes ==
Besides providing dialysis, NKF has instituted patient welfare programs, helping patients cope with illness, aiding them with re-integrating into society, as well as supporting their families.

=== Patient Employment Rehabilitation Programme ===
In November 2015, NKF launched the Patient Employment Rehabilitation Programme, to match jobless patients with suitable jobs, and hire some patients as staff.

=== Kidney Live Donor Support Programme ===
In 2009, the Kidney Live Donor Support Programme was launched to provide financial assistance for needy live donors to ensure that costs were not an obstacle for the donor's long-term medical follow-up.

== Partnerships ==
NKF partners with the Ministry of Health, other healthcare providers and the community, to increase awareness of kidney disease and prevention, promote kidney transplantation, and encourage home dialysis and to improve dialysis care.
