= 2010 in Singapore =

- Decades: 1990s; 2000s; 2010s; 2020s
- See also: Other events of 2010; Timeline of Singaporean history

The following lists events that happened during 2010 in the Republic of Singapore.

== Incumbents ==
- President: S. R. Nathan
- Prime Minister: Lee Hsien Loong

== Events ==
=== January ===
- January – TripleOne Somerset opens its doors.
- 1 January – MediaCorp ceased broadcasting TVMobile due to a high amount of resources required.
- 4 January –
  - The School of Science and Technology, Singapore is opened as a school specialising in STEM.
  - The West Loop of the Sengkang LRT line now operates in both directions during the morning and evening peak hours on weekdays.
- 11 January – The Ren Ci Community Hospital is officially opened.
- 17 January – The Bartley Viaduct is opened to traffic.
- 20 January –
  - Opening of Resorts World Sentosa's hotels, namely Festive Hotel, Hard Rock Hotel, Crockfords Tower and Hotel Michael.
  - Trek 2000 launches the Flucard with Toshiba, an SD card for cameras.
- 21 January – The Maxwell Chambers is officially opened.
- 28 January – The Mandarin Gallery is officially opened.
- 29 January – OCBC Bank launches the Bank of Singapore, a private banking service. This comes after OCBC Bank acquired ING Asia Private Bank last year.

=== February ===
- 1 February – The Economic Strategies Committee Report is released.
- 9 February – The National University Cancer Institute, Singapore is launched.
- 12 February – 2009 flu pandemic in Singapore: The Ministry of Health lowers the alert level from Yellow to Green.
- 14 February – Soft opening of Singapore's first casino and sneak preview of the Universal Studios Singapore at Resorts World Sentosa.
- 25 February – JTC Corporation and Economic Development Board unveil the CleanTech Park masterplan. It will be developed in three phases with a completion year of 2030.

=== March ===
- 4 March – The Republic of Singapore Navy warns of an unidentified terrorist group planning attacks against oil tankers in the Strait of Malacca.
- 5 March – The Singapore Tourism Board launches a new tourism slogan, YourSingapore, replacing former slogan, Uniquely Singapore, used since 2004.
- 12 March – Cross-carriage rules are introduced to rein in pay-tv costs, taking effect on 1 August 2011.
- 15 March – The Singapore Institute of Technology (SIT) has signed agreements with the five polytechnics, namely Singapore Polytechnic, Ngee Ann Polytechnic, Temasek Polytechnic, Nanyang Polytechnic and Republic Polytechnic to set up campuses in their premises under a 'distributed campus' approach, as well as exchange teaching talent, resulting in SIT opening its doors this year instead of 2011 as initially announced. The new campuses will be ready by 2014.
- 18 March – Soft opening of the Universal Studios Singapore at Resorts World Sentosa.
- 25 March – Battlestar Galactica ride in Universal Studios Singapore was temporarily closed down for the time because of a technical glitch.
- 26 March – Brigadier General Chan Chun Sing is appointed the new Chief of Army for the Singapore Army, taking over from Major General Neo Kian Hong.
- 29 March – Opening of the first phase of the Yishun Khoo Teck Puat Hospital.
- 30 March – CleanTech One's design is unveiled, the first building to be built under CleanTech Park.
- 31 March –
  - The first LNG terminal starts construction. When completed, it will enhance resiliency of the energy market in Singapore.
  - The Singapore Land Authority launches OneMap for the public.

=== April ===
- 1 April – Major General Neo Kian Hong is appointed the new Chief of Defence Force for the Singapore Armed Forces.
- 13 April – Applied Materials opens its new operations centre in Singapore.
- 17 April – Opening of the first and second stages of Circle MRT line.
- 24 April – Opening of The Helix Bridge, Bayfront Bridge and Youth Olympic Park in Marina Bay.
- 26 April – Amendments to the Constitution are passed with a vote of 74–1, as well as the Presidential Elections Act and Parliamentary Elections Act. Among them include the reduction of Group representation constituencies (GRC), increase in Non-Constituency Members of Parliament (NCMPs) to a maximum of nine (including elected opposition members of Parliament) and Nominated Members of Parliament (NMPs) to nine too, which is made permanent too. A "cooling-off" day is implemented, prohibiting campaigning, with only party political broadcasts allowed, as well as legalising Internet campaigning.
- 27 April – Opening of the first phase of the Singapore's second casino Marina Bay Sands.
- 30 April – StarHub TV revamped the channel numbering scheme by changing its channel numbers to a new three-digit numbering system.

=== May ===
- 1 May to 31 October – Singapore participates in the Expo 2010, which is held in Shanghai. Singapore then celebrated the Pavilion Day on 7 August.
- 3 May – A NEWater plant was officially opened in Changi, operated by Sembcorp. This makes it the largest NEWater plant ever in Singapore.
- 4 May – A new building for Straits Trading Company is officially opened.
- 11 May – CWT opens its new Commodity Hub.
- 12 May – Bosch opens its new South-East Asia headquarters in Singapore.
- 18 May – Singapore Freeport is officially opened, allowing for art collectables to be stored.
- 21 May – River Safari, Asia's first river-themed wildlife park starts construction. The park, which houses giant pandas too, will be completed by 2012.
- 24 May – Prime Minister Lee Hsien Loong and Malaysia Prime Minister Najib Razak jointly announced that Keretapi Tanah Melayu Tanjong Pagar railway station will be relocated to Woodlands Train Checkpoint by 1 July 2011, and a joint development of a rapid transit link between Tanjung Puteri, Johor Bahru and Singapore by 2018.
- 25 May – MT Bunga Kelana 3 collided with MV Waily in the Singapore Strait, causing an oil spill. Parts of East Coast beach was closed a day later.
- 29–30 May – 2010 Kallang slashings: A group of Malaysians and foreign workers from Sarawak armed themselves with weapons like a parang and tap handle and had committed four violent robberies, resulting in three men seriously injured and one dead. Seven suspects were arrested in connection to the brutal crimes while an eighth and final culprit fled Singapore for seven years until his capture. Four of these men (including the fugitive) were identified as the main culprits and charged with murder relating to the death of their final victim. One of them, Micheal Anak Garing, was sentenced to death and subsequently executed in 2019 for murder, while the remaining three men received lengthy jail terms ranging from 33 years to life and caning of 24 strokes each for robbery with hurt and murder.
- 31 May – City Harvest Church Criminal Breach of Trust Case: An investigation was conducted at the City Harvest Church made by the Office of the Commissioner of Charities (COC) and the Commercial Affairs Department (CAD) when a complaint was lodged towards 17 individuals (including church founder Pastor Kong Hee and his deputy, Tan Ye Peng) alleging the misuse of church funds.

=== June ===
- 4 to 6 June – The Shangri-La Dialogue is held in Singapore.
- 4 June – The Competition Commission of Singapore issued a fine to Sistic for abusing its dominant position through exclusive agreements with venues.
- 14 June – CNBC Asia's new studio inside the Singapore Exchange is opened, with the official opening a day later.
- 16 June – Heavy downpour causes flash floods around Singapore, Orchard Road being the worst hit.
- 19 June – *SCAPE, a youth-oriented space in Somerset was officially opened.
- 21 June – Sembcorp starts construction of its new yard in Tuas.
- 23 June – Opening of the second phase of Marina Bay Sands, which includes the Event Plaza along Marina Bay, more shops, additional dining options, and nightlife offerings. A day later, Sands SkyPark was opened to public.

=== July ===
- 1 July – The National Climate Change Secretariat was formed to formulate climate change policies in Singapore.
- 2 July – The new Dolphin Lagoon in Underwater World is officially opened.
- 3 July –
  - The introduction of Distance Fares in bus and rail transport in Singapore.
  - The Jewel of Muscat, a gift from Sultanate of Oman, reaches Singapore.
- 8 July –
  - SMRT's Explanade Xchange opens.
  - Tiger Sky Tower in Sentosa reopens after a technical malfunction last month.
- 12 July – SingTel and StarHub broadcast the final match of the 2010 FIFA World Cup in 3D, in conjunction with partners Resorts World Sentosa and Marina Bay Sands.
- 14 July – The Government of Singapore upgraded its 2010 economic growth forecast to 13 to 15%.
- 21 July – Reopening of Singapore Cable Car.

=== August ===
- 9 August – Singapore launches a nationwide 3D television trial, starting with recording of the annual National Day Parade in 3D.
- 13 August – Singapore is presented with a specially designed Olympic Flag and Prime Minister Lee Hsien Loong is conferred the Gold Olympic Order.
- 14–26 August – Inaugural Youth Olympic Games:
  - 14 August – Opening Ceremony for the 2010 Summer Youth Olympics by President S R Nathan, who he was conferred the Gold Olympic Order.
  - 16 August – Singapore won its first medal at the 2010 Summer Youth Olympics, a bronze medal in the Boys' Under–55kg taekwondo event.
  - 18 August – Rainer Ng won Singapore's first silver medal in the Boys' 50m backstroke event.
  - 19 August – Singapore's under-15 Boys' football team advances to the semi-finals.
  - 23 August – Isabelle Li won Singapore's second silver medal after losing to China's Gu Yuting in the table tennis girls' singles final.
  - 26 August – Closing Ceremony:
    - Eight Singaporeans are presented with the Silver Olympic Order and an Olympic Cup is presented to the people of Singapore.
    - A total seven medals were won throughout the event; two silver and five bronze, placing 62nd out of the 98 nations.
- 19 August – Downtown MRT line Stage 3 was unveiled, which will connect eastern Singapore. The line will be finished by 2017 instead of 2016.
- 31 August – Internet companies in Singapore launch service plans for the new optical fibre network as part of the Next Generation Nationwide Broadband Network (Next Gen NBN).

=== September ===
- 1 September – The Ministry of Education announced several measures to improve education. Among them include enhancements to primary school facilities, more Indoor Sports Halls and synthetic turfs, new Higher NITEC and Polytechnic Foundation Programme, two new N(T) specialised schools by 2013, expansion of Integrated Programme to seven more schools and a new Junior College by 2017, the new Lee Kong Chian School of Medicine with Imperial College London, and more funding for university education. In addition, new arts degree programmes funded by Nanyang Academy of Fine Arts and LASALLE College of the Arts will be provided in collaboration with international universities. This will build on the arts diploma programmes that have been funded since 1999.
- 17 September – China Eastern Flight 568 which was bound for Shanghai, caught fire shortly after it took off from Singapore Changi Airport. No one was hurt.
- 20 September – Singapore and Malaysia have settled a land swap agreement for four land parcels in Marina South and two land parcels in the Ophir Rochor area. The development will be undertaken by M+S Pte Ltd, a 50–50 joint venture between Temasek Holdings and Khazanah Nasional. However, as there were different views on developmental charges, the matter will be brought to the Permanent Court of Arbitration.
- 24 September – Mas Selamat bin Kastari, the leader of the Singapore Jemaah Islamiyah terrorist network and as a fugitive since 2008, is handed over to Singapore custody by the Malaysian authorities.
- 30 September – A Republic of Singapore Air Force Boeing AH-64 Apache made an emergency landing in an open field in Woodlands.

=== October ===
- 2 October – Kwa Geok Choo, wife of Minister Mentor Lee Kuan Yew, and mother of the current Prime Minister Lee Hsien Loong, dies at age 89.
- 11 October – The first phase of CleanTech Park (known as CleanTech One) is launched.
- 21 October – The haze, which enveloped Singapore since 19 October, reached a PSI of 108 at 6pm, considered an unhealthy level. This is the worst PSI reading since the 2006 haze.
- 22 October – The Council for Estate Agencies is formed to regulate real estate agencies.
- 30 October – Downtown East Murder. 19-year-old Darren Ng Wei Jie, a student from Republic Polytechnic, was brutally slashed by a total of 12 youths from a rival gang after a staring incident. Darren suffered from a total of 28 knife wounds and he died in Changi General Hospital five hours after the incident. The case was classified as murder, and the police managed to arrest all the suspects. Six of them were charged with murder, but all except one were later sentenced to serve lengthy jail terms with caning for culpable homicide (the sixth was instead found guilty of rioting), while the others were dealt with varied jail terms and caning for rioting.

=== November ===
- 2 November – British author and former journalist, Alan Shadrake, was found guilty of contempt of court to Singapore judicial system for his book Once a Jolly Hangman: Singapore Justice in the Dock.
- 4 November – Qantas Flight 32, an Airbus A380, made a dramatic emergency landing at Singapore Changi Airport following a mid-air engine explosion shortly after takeoff. No injuries were reported.
- 5 November – Qantas Flight 6, a Boeing 747-400, made an emergency landing at Singapore Changi Airport following an engine problem shortly after takeoff. No injuries were reported.
- 15 November – The Khoo Teck Puat Hospital is officially opened.
- 22 November – The Land Transport Authority completes a thorough review of bus stop pair distances and found out that bus commuters were overcharged $300,000 and undercharged $100,000.
- 22 November – Hong San See wins the Asia-Pacific Heritage Awards for Culture Heritage Conservation from UNESCO.
- 24 November – Marina Bay Link Mall opens to the public.
- 25 November – nex opens in Serangoon.

=== December ===
- 8 December – MediaCorp announced that the studios will be moving out of its premises at Caldecott Hill to Mediapolis@one–north Buona Vista by 2015.
- 10 December – Ten Mile Junction LRT station is temporarily closed due to retrofitting works.
- 25 December – Crane Dance (Resorts World Sentosa) opens.
- 27 December – The Singapore Conference Hall, the Trade Union House, Lim Bo Seng Memorial, Tan Kim Seng Fountain and the Cenotaph have been gazetted as National Monuments of Singapore.
- 28 December – Recommendations to improve secondary school education are announced.
- 31 December – Singapore's economy grew by 14.7% for the whole year (lowered to 14.5%), the largest growth for the country of all time.

== Deaths ==
- 10 January – Goh Poh Seng, physician and arts pioneer (b. 1936).
- 30 January – Tan Eng Yoon, former Olympian (b. 1928).
- 2 February – Ng Teng Fong, property tycoon (b. 1928).
- 4 March – Fang Xiu, pioneer of Chinese literature in Singapore and Malaysia (b. 1922).
- 20 March – Yang Lina, actress (b. 1963).
- 28 April – Low Por Tuck, former Parliamentary Secretary to the Ministry of Finance and former PAP and Barisan Sosialis legislative assemblyman for Havelock Constituency (b. 1929).
- 14 May – Goh Keng Swee, former Deputy Prime Minister of Singapore (b. 1918).
- 30 May – Shanmuganathan Dillidurai, murder victim of the Kallang slashings (b. 1968–1969).
- 17 June – K. S. Rajah, former Judicial Commissioner (b. 1930).
- 26 July – S. Tiwari, senior legal officer at Singapore Legal Service (b. 1945).
- 8 August – Soon Loh Boon, former President of the Singapore Chinese Middle School Students Union and student movement leader in the 1950s (b. 1934).
- 22 September – Hoe Hong Lin, murder victim of Soh Wee Kian (b. 1978).
- 27 September – Balaji Sadasivan, Senior Minister of State for Foreign Affairs (b. 1955).
- 2 October – Kwa Geok Choo, spouse of former Prime Minister Lee Kuan Yew (b. 1920).
- 14 October – Dollah Kassim, Singaporean footballer (b. 1949).
- 30 October – Darren Ng Wei Jie, murder victim of the Downtown East slashing (b. 1991).
- 10 November – William Cheng, 10th Chairman of the Central Provident Fund (b. 1928).
- 12 November – Kwa Soon Chuan, 9th Chairman of the Central Provident Fund (b. 1922).
- 27 November – Mohamed Kassim Abdul Jabbar, former PAP Member of Parliament for Radin Mas Constituency (b. 1933).
