= 2007 in Singapore =

- Decades: 1980s; 1990s; 2000s; 2010s; 2020s
- See also: Other events of 2007; Timeline of Singaporean history

The following lists events that happened during 2007 in the Republic of Singapore.

== Incumbents ==
- President: S.R. Nathan
- Prime Minister: Lee Hsien Loong

== Events ==
=== January ===
- 2 January – NorthLight School starts taking in students who did not do well in Primary School Leaving Examination and could not cope with mainstream education.
- 3 January –
  - Keppel Corporation launches Reflections at Keppel Bay, a waterfront condominium with six glass towers and 11 villas dotting the area. The development is completed in 2011.
  - The Straits Times Index breaks the 3,000 barrier for the first time.
- 15 January – Sentosa Express is opened.
- 16 January – Fort Canning Tunnel is opened to traffic.
- 19 January – StarHub launches its HDTV service, the first commercial HDTV service in Singapore and Southeast Asia.
- 20 January – The University of New South Wales Asia campus is officially opened, making it the first foreign university in Singapore. However, it suddenly closed after four months.
- 29 January – The Public Utilities Board moves out of the Singapore Power Building, relocating its office at the Environment Building, the Ministry of Sustainability and the Environment's headquarters.

=== February ===
- 3 February – Giant Hypermarket warehouse at Tampines retail Park is officially opened.
- 4 February – The Singapore national football team wins the 2007 AFF Championship.
- 5 February – The residential component of Orchard Turn Development is named The Orchard Residences.
- 8 February –
  - The Jurong Rock Caverns starts construction as the first underground rock cavern in Southeast Asia, used for storage of oil and chemicals. Phase 1 will be commissioned by 2011, being officially opened on 2 September 2014.
  - The Police Coast Guard's Brani Regional Base is officially opened by Minister for Home Affairs Wong Kan Seng.
- 9 February – DigiPen opens a new campus in one-north, making it the first in Asia. The school offers gaming courses.
- 15 February – Changes to the CPF are announced, as well as the introduction of Workfare to help low-income Singaporeans.

=== March ===
- 2 March – One Raffles Quay is officially opened.
- 9 March – The S P Jain campus is officially opened.
- 15 March – The fourth NEWater plant is officially opened in Ulu Pandan.
- 19 March – The Trim and Fit programme will be scrapped in favour of a Holistic Health Framework, after complaints of overweight children being teased and bullied.
- 26 March –
  - The Sentosa Musical Fountain stages its last two shows.
  - The Songs of the Sea show debuts in Sentosa, replacing the Sentosa Musical Fountain. The show opened to the public the next day, running for seven years until its last show in 2014.
- 30 March – The Monetary Authority of Singapore is prepared to grant DBS Bank a licence to set up an Islamic bank.
- 31 March – The first Tamil Language Festival is launched.

=== April ===
- 1 April – The Basic Mail Services Market is fully liberalised, allowing players other than SingPost to operate mail services.
- 12 April – The Spam Control Act is passed to control spam.
- 16 April – The Resorts World Sentosa starts construction, which will be completed by 2010.
- 23 April – The NUS High School of Math and Science campus is officially opened, making it the first school in Singapore to specialise in Maths and Science, as well as providing its own lessons and diploma. In addition, the school is affiliated to the National University of Singapore.
- 27 April – The Land Transport Authority announced the Downtown line, a 40 km (25 mi) three–stage line targeted by 2018.
- 28 April – The Ang Mo Kio Bus Interchange is officially opened as Singapore's third air–conditioned bus interchange.

=== May ===
- 7 May – The Islamic Bank of Asia is launched by DBS Bank, making it Singapore's first Shariah–compliant bank. This comes after the Monetary Authority of Singapore grants DBS a licence to do so.
- 8 May – Sing to the Dawn is targeted for a release in 2008, which ultimately did on 30 October the following year. This makes it Singapore's first English animated film.
- 11 May – Singapore acquires the rights to host the Formula One race with the first to be held either in September or October 2008, potentially being the first night race in the world. The race shall initially run for five years, with a future option for another five. Other measures are announced for the smooth running of Formula 1, with the Government covering 60 percent of costs, imposing a tiered cess of not more than 30 percent on hotels for seven days with those near to the race paying more, and setting up an interagency committee against potential inconveniences and disruptions.
- 18 May –
  - The first $5 polymer notes are released.
  - Local drinks company Out of the Box launches the "Anything" and "Whatever range of drinks. However, the campaign is married by vandalism at bus stops, leading to the campaign being scrapped. Nowadays, the drinks have disappeared from the Singapore market.
- 20 May – The Float @ Marina Bay opens as a temporary stadium, the largest floating stage in the world.
- 27 May – Onepeople.sg is launched to unite Singaporeans.
- 31 May – To cater for increased traffic due to new developments in Marina Bay, a new road system is finally opened after three phases.

=== June ===
- 13 June – A public watersports centre will be built on the current Oasis Building site as part of the Singapore Sports Hub project.
- 15 June –
  - Oasis LRT station is opened for service.
  - The Bukit Batok Civil Service Club is officially opened, replacing the previous facility in Dempsey Road that operated for 30 years. The facility also makes it the first to be built in a Housing and Development Board (HDB) area.
- 24 June – 17-year-old triathlete Thaddeus Cheong Wing Kit dies after completing a triathlon, which was part of the SEA Games selection trial.
- 27 June – A$20 note to commemorate 40 years of the Currency Interchangeability Agreement is launched by both Prime Minister Lee Hsien Loong and His Majesty Sultan Hassanal Bolkiah.
- 28 June – The University of New South Wales Asia campus in Singapore is closed.
- 30 June – The National Stadium is closed.

=== July ===
- 1 July –
  - The Goods and Services Tax is raised from 5% to 7%.
  - Muhammad Nasir Abdul Aziz is ordered by Aniza Binte Essa, his lover, to murder her husband Manap Sarlip. Both Nasir and Aniza are arrested shortly after. Aniza is initially charged with abetting murder, a charge carrying the death penalty. This is later reduced to abetting manslaughter. A psychiatrist discovers she had a mental disorder that diminished her responsibility for the murder. She is sentenced to 9 years jail while Nasir pleaded guilty to murder. As he was under 18 years old when the murder took place, he is spared the gallows and hence indefinitely detained under the President's pleasure.
- 7 July – The retail component of Orchard Turn Development is named ION Orchard.
- 9 July – Specialists' Shopping Centre is closed.
- 20 July – SingTel's mio TV (now Singtel TV) is launched, becoming the second pay television operator in Singapore after StarHub TV.
- 27 July – Minister for Transport Raymond Lim announced the Marina Coastal Expressway, a 5 km (3.1 mi) expressway with five lanes and includes Singapore's first undersea tunnel, linking East Coast Parkway and Kallang–Paya Lebar Expressway to Marina South and Ayer Rajah Expressway, targeted by 2013. The exact date when Phase 1 of Kallang–Paya Lebar Expressway opens is announced too.
- 31 July – Republic Polytechnic's new campus opened in Woodlands.

=== August ===
- 3 August – The Ministry of Education announced that Special and Express streams in secondary schools will merge from 2008 as content between the two streams becomes similar.
- 9 August – Singapore held its inaugural National Day Parade at Marina Bay Floating Stadium for the first time, after the original location of National Stadium closed down for retrofitting works until 2014; the Stadium would later go on became a permanent hosting venue for the parade every year (except 2010, 2015, 2016, 2019 and 2020).
- 19 August – Punggol 21 Plus is announced, which will be transformed into a waterfront district with leisure activities and a future Punggol Waterway formed by damming two reservoirs. At the same time, a Home Improvement Programme is announced for flats built until 1986.
- 26 August – The Ministry of Health announced that National University Hospital will house two new specialty centres to treat cancer and heart disease; the top two killers in Singapore. They have since been known as the National University Cancer Institute, Singapore and National University Heart Centre, Singapore respectively.
- 31 August – The F1 Pit Building begins construction for the preparation of the Singapore Grand Prix in 2008.

=== September ===
- 2 September – Dave Teo Ming, a 20-year-old National Serviceman, gone AWOL with a rifle and bullets he stole from the camp. He was arrested after a 20-hour manhunt and charged under the Arms Offences Act. Teo was sentenced the following year to nine years and two months' imprisonment and 18 strokes of the cane.
- 29 September – The ONE°15 Marina Club is opened at Sentosa Cove.
- 30 September – ElderShield is enhanced, paying S$400 over 6 years should those insured fall into severe disabilities.

=== October ===
- 8 October –
  - Singapore rejoins UNESCO after a 22-year pullout.
  - The New York University Tisch School of the Arts Asia campus is officially opened. It operated until its closure in 2014.
- 11 October – The Straits Times Index hits a record high of 3,875.77 points.
- 15 October – Singapore Airlines takes delivery of the first Airbus A380 superjumbo jet. It would make its inaugural commercial flight ten days later on 25 October.
- 22 to 23 October – A debate on Section 377A ensues in Parliament, which is ultimately retained with an assurance that the law will not be used widely.
- 23 October – Amendments to the Penal Code are passed to deal with sex crimes better, including recognition of marital rape, and dealing with wounding racial and religious sensitivities. Oral and anal sex are decriminalised, with the offence replaced by non-consensual acts criminalised.
- 26 October –
  - The Singapore Sports Council announced a new permanent motorsports facility in Changi, which will be completed by 2011. The facility is now known as the Changi Motorsports Hub, which is called off in 2013.
  - The first phase of Kallang–Paya Lebar Expressway opens to traffic, serving the Kallang area.
- 28 October – The Jurong West Sports and Recreation Centre is officially opened as the largest sports facility in Singapore, along with the first Satellite Sports Museum.

=== November ===
- November –
  - Keppel Corporation commissions a combined-cycle power plant on Jurong Island.
  - Leisure Park Kallang reopens after a facelift.
- 6 November – Resorts World Sentosa announced that it will add six new attractions to its resort.
- 7 November – The Building and Construction Authority announced a new Zero-Energy Building (ZEB), to be retrofitted from an existing building. When completed, the building will house classrooms, offices and training centres, as well as testbeds for green technologies.
- 11 November – National broadcaster Mediacorp rolls out HD5, the high definition version of Channel 5.
- 15 November – Farmway LRT station is opened for service.
- 18 to 22 November – Singapore hosted the 13th ASEAN Summit and Third East Asia Summit.
- 18 November – The national football team of Singapore manages to get into the third round of the 2010 World Cup qualifiers of the Asian qualifying section.
- 19 November –
  - Singapore was shortlisted as a candidate city to host the 2010 Youth Olympics.
  - Singapore will be a stopover for the 2008–2009 Volvo Ocean Race.
- 20 November – The African Cheetah Enclosure is officially opened in the Singapore Zoo. A 5-year masterplan to boost the Mandai area is also unveiled too.
- 24 November – A group of five national dragonboaters drown in a dragonboating competition in Cambodia's Tonlé Sap River.

=== December ===
- 1 December – Tharman Shanmugaratnam becomes the Finance Minister, taking over from Prime Minister Lee Hsien Loong.
- 3 December – The Agri-Food and Veterinary Authority of Singapore and Ministry of Health advised people to dispose off PrimaDeli's chocolate cakes after a spate of food poisoning cases caused by salmonella bacteria in cakes. These cases were first detected on 23 November, with the last case on 26 November. The next day, PrimaDeli is required to stop production in its factory (which resumed on 21 December), and subsequently all shops, which reopened on 1 January the following year. The final tally stood at 204 cases, making it Singapore's worst food poisoning outbreak before the 2009 Geylang Serai rojak stall incident. As a result, PrimaDeli is fined a maximum of $5,000 on 7 March 2008.
- 6 to 15 December – Team Singapore participated in the 2007 Southeast Asian Games in Thailand and won 43 gold, 43 silver and 41 bronze medals.
- 16 December – Singapore Idol winner Hady Mirza participated, and won Asian Idol.

== Births ==
- 21 August – Arfan Ariff – Malaysian professional footballer

== Deaths ==
- 6 February – Ho Piao, former trade unionist and political detainee (b. 1937).
- 13 April – Seow Peck Leng, educator and former Singapore People's Alliance legislative assemblywoman for Mountbatten Constituency (b. 1911).
- 21 April – Sheng Nam Chin, former Parliamentary Secretary to the Ministry of Health and former PAP and Barisan Sosialis legislative assemblyman for Nee Soon Constituency (b. 1930).
- 9 May – Leong Keng Seng, former Parliamentary Secretary to the Ministry of Education and former PAP and Barisan Sosialis legislative assemblyman for Serangoon Gardens Constituency (b. 1929).
- 3 June – Ho Cheng Choon, former Parliamentary Secretary to the Ministry of National Development and Ministry of Law and former PAP Member of Parliament for Geylang East Constituency (b. 1935).
- 21 June – Nithiah Nandan, unionist and ex-Nominated Member of Parliament (b. 1949).
- 24 June – Thaddeus Cheong Wing Kit, triathlete (b. 1990).
- 1 July
  - Manap Sarlip, murder victim of Muhammad Nasir Abdul Aziz and Aniza Essa (b. 1978).
  - Smaelmeeral Abdul Aziz, murder victim in the Stirling Road murder (b. 1975).
- 24 July – Yeo Choo Kok, former PAP Member of Parliament for Delta Constituency (b. 1936).
- 21 August – Howe Yoon Chong, former Minister for Defence and Health (b. 1923).
- 20 October – Pan Hui, murder victim in the Marsiling flat murder (b. 1992).
- 8 November – Amy Ede, former Progressive Party City Councillor for East Ward and pioneer of orchid trading (b. 1923).
- 9 November – Sim Kee Boon, former civil servant, and chairman of Civil Aviation Authority of Singapore, notable for his contributions for Singapore Changi Airport (b. 1929).
- 24 November – Victims of the 2007 Tonlé Sap dragon boat accident.
  - Chee Wei Cheng, full-time national serviceman (b. 1987)
  - Jeremy Goh, undergraduate of SIM (b. 1983).
  - Stephen Loh, physical-education teacher at the National Junior College (b. 1976).
  - Poh Boon San, engineer at the Defence Science and Technology Agency (b. 1980).
  - Reuben Kee, music composer and former beauty pageant winner (b. 1984).
- 19 December – Zhu Xu, pioneering figure in the history of Singapore theatre (b. 1909).
