= 2011 in Singapore =

- Decades: 1990s; 2000s; 2010s; 2020s
- See also: Other events of 2011; Timeline of Singaporean history

The following lists events that happened during 2011 in the Republic of Singapore.

== Incumbents ==
- President: S. R. Nathan (until 31 August), Tony Tan Keng Yam (starting 1 September)
- Prime Minister: Lee Hsien Loong

== Events ==
Below, events for the 2011 Singaporean general election and 2011 Singaporean presidential election have the "SGE" and "SPE" prefixes, respectively.

=== January ===
- 1 January –
  - The Immigration and Checkpoints Authority implements the registration of double-barrelled race options for Singaporean children born to parents of different races.
  - The National Population and Talent Division was formed to formulate immigration policies in Singapore.
- 2 January – The Criminal Procedure Code (CPC) 2010 and Coroners Act 2010 come into force.
- 8 January – The Ministry of National Development launches the "Remaking Our Heartland" plans at Hougang, with the vision "Colours of Hougang – Enriching and Engaging".
- 11 January –
  - Four new MRT stations for Tuas West Extension are announced (up from the initial three stations), which will be ready by 2016. In addition, a new road viaduct will be integrated with the MRT extension, along with the expansion of the future Tuas depot to cater for the extension. There will be 13 new trains for the East–West MRT line and 16 new trains for the Circle MRT line to cater for future demand.
  - New laws are passed to set the re-employment age at 65.
- 15 January – The Ministry of National Development launches the "Remaking Our Heartland" plans at East Coast, with the vision "Gateway to the East Coast".
- 19 January – The Land Transport Authority announces the northern alignment of the North-South Expressway (now North-South Corridor).
- 21 January – The revised Telecom Competition Code is enforced.
- 22 January – The Ministry of National Development launches the "Remaking Our Heartland" plans at Jurong Lake District.
- 23 January – Woodlands Waterfront officially opens.
- 26 January – The first satellite blood collection centre opens in Woodlands.
- 28 January – The inaugural grand draw of Changi Millionaire, entitled Be a Changi Millionaire, which hosted by Singapore Changi Airport, was held; former Singaporean Perfect 10 DJ (now 987FM) Ivan Rantung became the inaugural winner of the S$1 million grand prize. Earlier, Rantung was qualified for the grand draw on October through a purchase of a Canon DSLR camera.
- 29 January – The Sentosa Boardwalk officially opens.
- 30 January – Heavy and intense downpour causes flash floods around Singapore.
- 30 January to 6 February – Team Singapore participates in the 2011 Asian Winter Games held in Astana and Almaty, Kazakhstan.

=== February ===
- 17 February – Marina Bay Sands officially opens, ArtScience Museum and a free night show, known as Wonder Full debut.
- 18 February – Radio and television licence fees are abolished with immediate effect.
- 21 February – The re-opening of Battlestar Galactica ride in Universal Studios Singapore after a technical glitch caused it to be closed just one week after opening.
- 24 February – SGE: The Electoral Boundaries Review Committee report was released, revealing that the 12th parliament consist of 87 members from the 27 constituencies (12 Single Member Constituencies and 15 Group Representation Constituencies), up from 84 seats from the 24 constituencies in the current government.

=== March ===
- 3 March – Disney's The Lion King musical production debuts at the Marina Bay Sands Theatre.
- 5 March – The Lorong Halus Wetland and riverfront promenade are officially launched.
- 11 March – The Singapore Exchange (SGX) has filed a formal application with Australia's Foreign Investment Review Board for acquiring the Australian Securities Exchange (ASX).
- 22 March – Finance Minister Tharman Shanmugaratnam became the chairman for the International Monetary and Financial Committee.
- 25 March – Brigadier General Ravinder Singh is the new Chief of Army for the Singapore Army. The preceding Chief of Army, Chan Chun Sing, would later enter the political arena by participating in the forthcoming 2011 general election.
- 31 March – National Equestrian Park officially opens.

=== April ===
- 1 April – SingHealth will take over the operations of Bright Vision Hospital citing management challenges.
- 8 April
  - The Government of Australia officially blocked the proposed merger of SGX and ASX.
  - The Tanjong Pagar Railway Station is gazetted as a National Monument.
- 11 April – Yale-NUS College is officially launched as Singapore's first university offering liberal arts, in collaboration with Yale University and the National University of Singapore, coming after an announcement two weeks earlier.
- 18 April – ITE College West in Choa Chu Kang is officially opened.
- 20 April – Prime Minister Lee Hsien Loong accepted Senior Minister S Jayakumar, Minister in Prime Minister's Office Lim Boon Heng and Speaker of Parliament Abdullah Tarmugi retirement from politics and government.
- 21 April – The National University Heart Centre, Singapore is launched.
- 26 April – Bedok Point officially opens to the public.
- 27 April – SGE: The Nomination Day for the 2011 general election; at the close of nomination, only the five-member People's Action Party team from Tanjong Pagar GRC (which led by Lee Kuan Yew) was elected unopposed.

=== May ===
- 7 May – SGE: Polling Day for the 2011 general election.
  - The ruling People's Action Party retained a supermajority of seats (winning 81 seats, including the five seats won uncontested) but with a record-low overall vote share (post-independence) of 60.14%.
  - The main opposition party, Workers' Party, won the remaining six seats from the two constituencies (Aljunied GRC and Hougang SMC; the former marked the first time any opposition party had assumed control for a GRC).
  - A third party, the Singapore People's Party, lost the Potong Pasir SMC, ending a 27-year control by the opposition since the party's leader Chiam See Tong (who went to contest Bishan-Toa Payoh GRC and lost) assumed the constituency after its first victory in 1984.
- 10 to 11 May – SGE/SPE:
  - Foreign Minister George Yeo announced that he would retire from politics in the wake of his election defeat. A day later, Minister in Prime Minister's Office Lim Hwee Hua also stepped down.
  - Yeo, however, announced that he declined in running for the 2011 Presidential Election, citing Yeo a "free spirit" and not "temperamentally suited" for the Presidency.
- 14 May – SGE:
  - Singapore's former Prime Ministers, Minister Mentor Lee Kuan Yew and Senior Minister Goh Chok Tong announces departure from the Cabinet.
  - Three other members from the former cabinet, Wong Kan Seng, Mah Bow Tan and Raymond Lim, earlier also retired from the cabinet but remained as MPs, thus abolishing the Senior Minister post that would remain vacant for the next eight years until 1 May 2019.
- 16 May –
  - Cathay Pacific Flight 715, an Airbus A330-300, made an emergency landing at Singapore Changi Airport following an engine fire shortly after takeoff. No one was hurt.
  - The opening of Madagascar: A Crate Adventure in Universal Studios Singapore.
- 18 May –
  - Prime Minister Lee Hsien Loong announces major changes to the Cabinet; the cabinet members were sworn to the parliament three days later, and then Parliamentary Secretaries two days after.
  - Heng Swee Keat was given a cabinet ministerial portfolio for Education, the first time a newly-elected Member-of-Parliament was immediately conferred a membership in a Cabinet in about 26 years.
  - iFly Singapore, an indoor wind tunnel facility, is officially opened.
- 21 May –
  - SingTel successfully launches Singapore's second commercial satellite, ST-2, into orbit following a lift-off from Kourou, French Guiana.
  - The Clementi Mall is officially opened.
- 27 May –
  - New Platform at Jurong East MRT station opens, with 5 new C151As launched.
  - SPE: Tan Cheng Bock, a former People's Action Party MP, declared his intention to contest in the presidential election.
  - The Bukit Timah Railway Station is gazetted as a conserved building.
- 28 May – The Universal Studios Singapore is officially opened.

=== June ===
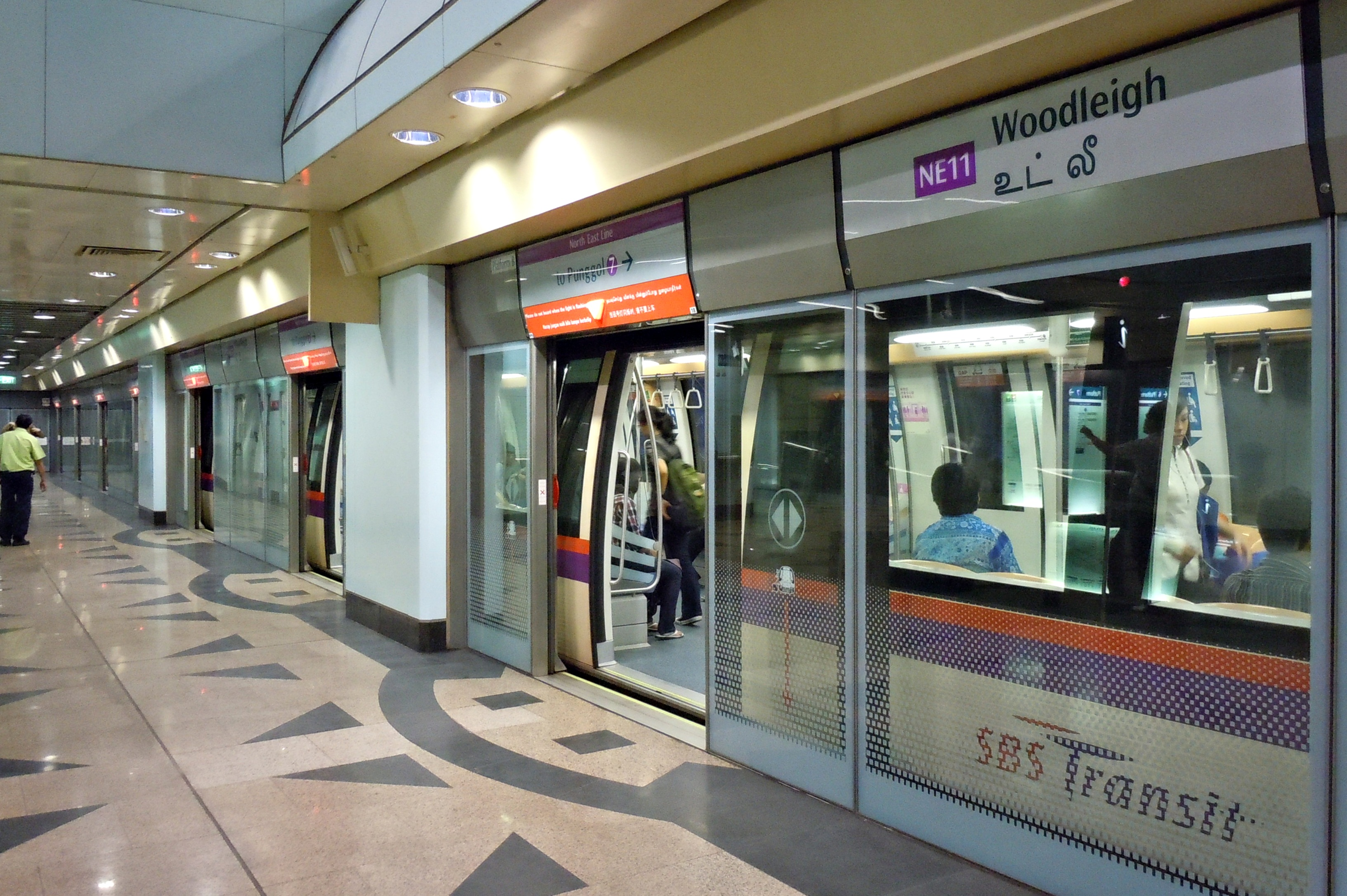
Woodleigh MRT station

- 1 June –
  - British author and former journalist, Alan Shadrake, began his sentence of eight weeks for contempt of court to the Singapore judicial system for his book Once a Jolly Hangman: Singapore Justice in the Dock.
  - SPE: Application for the Certificate of Eligibility from the Presidential Elections Committee opens.
- 2 June – SPE: George Yeo reconsidered his intention to contest the Presidential Election on his Facebook page, "thinking hard" about a run. He announced that he would make a decision on candidacy three days later, but later confirmed on 15 June that he ultimately declined participating in the election.
- 3 to 5 June – The 10th Shangri-La Dialogue.
- 5 June – Heavy and intense downpour causes flash floods around Singapore.
- 7 June –
  - Singapore Airlines and Virgin Australia establish a long-term alliance.
  - SPE: Former NTUC Income Chief Tan Kin Lian announced his candidacy.
- 16 June – The Land Transport Authority announced that the Thomson MRT line depot will be located in Mandai, to begin construction at the end of 2012. Two stations, an interchange with Woodlands MRT station and a station located near Republic Polytechnic are announced too.
- 20 June – Woodleigh MRT station and Damai LRT station open. In addition, the East Loop of the Punggol LRT line is operational in both directions throughout the day.
- 21 June – M1 Limited launches South-East Asia first ultra-high speed mobile services with Long Term Evolution.
- 23 June – SPE: Former Deputy Prime Minister Tony Tan announced candidacy, while also resigned from the director and chairperson roles for Government of Singapore Investment Corporation (GIC) and Singapore Press Holdings (SPH), respectively.
- 25 June – The Energy Market Authority and Land Transport Authority announced the launch of an electric vehicle test-bed.
- 27 June – Singapore and Malaysia have agreed on several proposals, including building a rapid-transit link to Johor Bahru, a joint venture company to develop wellness projects in Medini and the formation of M+S Pte Ltd for land swap projects.

=== July ===
- 1 July –
  - Central Provident Fund minimum sum to be revised upwards to S$131,000.
  - Keretapi Tanah Melayu's Tanjong Pagar railway station relocated to the Woodlands Train Checkpoint.
  - SPE: Incumbent President S.R. Nathan, declined seeking a third term in presidency.
- 3 July – The Serangoon and Punggol Reservoirs are completed.
- 4 July – The Design, Build and Sell Scheme is scrapped after complaints of high prices. However, existing DBSS projects will continue. By the end of this scheme, 13 such projects were developed.
- 14 July - ONE Championship (ONE FC) (then ONE Fighting Championship (ONE FC), a mixed martial arts sports event was launched by Thai sports entrepreneur Chatri Sityodtong and Canadian sports executive Victor Cui.
- 15 July –
  - A new television rating, PG13 (an enhanced version of Parental Guidance but specialized for 13-year-old audience) takes effect, along with standardised colours (green circles as advisory ratings, orange boxes as age-restricted ratings). In addition, internet service providers (ISPs) will have to promote internet filtering services from September, with StarHub the first to launch its mobile filtering service, SafeShield Mobile.
  - SPE: Former Singapore Democratic Party member Tan Jee Say announced his candidacy.
  - The School of The Arts' new campus is officially opened.
- 18 July – Vision 2030 is launched to improve sports in Singapore, which includes a sports masterplan which will be released in 2012.

=== August ===
- 1 August – Pay television cross carriage takes effect.
- 3 August – SPE: The Writ of Election for the Presidential Election was released, and the application for the Certificate of Eligibility closed three days later.
- 8 August – The curry dispute was made public.
- 11 August – SPE: Tan Cheng Bock, Tan Jee Say, Tony Tan and Tan Kin Lian, were awarded Certificates of Eligibility from the committee; all four candidates confirmed their nominations during the nomination day on 17 August, six days later.
- 13 to 19 August – The inaugural Singapore Youth Olympic Festival.
- 27 August – SPE: Polling Day for the 2011 presidential election.
  - Vote counting was prolonged until 4:23 am as a vote recount was initiated by Tan Cheng Bock, due to a 2%-margin between the top two candidates.
  - Tony Tan won the election by a vote share of 35.20% or 744,397 votes (excluding 1,296 overseas votes); Tan Cheng Bock finished second with a vote share of 34.85% or 737,128 votes (excluding 1,183 overseas votes).
  - Tan Kin Lian garnered only a 4.91% share of votes, or 104,095 votes (excluding 164 overseas votes), and forfeited his S$48,000 deposit. Earlier on, he conceded at about 10:30 pm citing that he might not be able to return his deposit but the experience of running the race has been useful, and hinted that the elections "will be a tough fight between the top two candidate(s)".
- 29 August – SBS Transit is appointed the operator of the Downtown MRT line after winning the bid. This is the first MRT line to be run under the New Rail Financing Framework, where the Land Transport Authority owns the line, with the operator given a 15-year licence.
- 31 August –
  - Singapore's first Water Agreement with Malaysia expires.
  - The Ocean Financial Centre is officially opened.
  - Current President S R Nathan's term expires, ending his Presidential career after 12 years.

=== September ===
- 1 September –
  - SPE: Tony Tan, who won the presidential election prior, was sworn in as Singapore's seventh President.
  - The Workplace Safety and Health Act is extended to all workplaces.
- 3 September –
  - The first H&M store opens in Orchard Road.
  - Serangoon Bus Interchange officially opened as Singapore's fifth air-conditioned bus interchange.
- 12 September –
  - 3 special education schools will expand.
  - The Bukit Brown Road (now Lornie Highway) was announced to relieve congestion on Lornie Road, completed on 19 April 2019. The announcement attracted strong attention from heritage groups after graves are required for exhumation.
- 28 September – The Public Hygiene Council is formed in an effort to keep Singapore clean.

=== October ===
- 8 October –
  - Stages 4 and 5 of the Circle MRT line are opened.
  - Bus and train fares will increase overall by 1%.
- 10 October – SGE: The first session of the 12th Parliament of Singapore is opened.
- 15 October – The Maritime Experiential Museum & Aquarium is opened in Resorts World Sentosa.
- 23 October – Punggol Waterway Park is opened.

=== November ===
- 1 November – Singapore Airlines has launched a new medium and long-haul low-cost carrier called Scoot. This comes after initial plans on 25 May to launch a low cost carrier within a year.
- 6 November – Changi City Point is opened.
- 8 November – Asia Square Tower 1 is officially opened.
- 13 to 20 November – The 20th World Orchid Conference is held at Marina Bay Sands Expo and Convention Centre.
- 14 November – The Flower Dome of the Gardens by the Bay opens to the public for a week-long preview.
- 15 November – The southern alignment of the North-South Expressway (now North-South Corridor) is announced, making the expressway 21.5 km (13.4 miles) in length.
- 18 November –
  - 112 Katong is opened to the public after a revamp.
  - The Eastern Health Alliance is launched as the sixth health cluster in Singapore.
- 26 November –
  - Clementi Bus Interchange opened as the sixth air-conditioned bus interchange in Singapore. With amendment of bus routes, SBS Transit service 284M was withdrawn.
  - Escape Theme Park is closed after NTUC Club announced redevelopment plans for Downtown East on 3 November.

=== December ===
- 1 December – MediaCorp ceases its digital audio broadcasting (DAB) service. This comes as growth in DAB listeners stagnated over the years.
- 3 December – Transformers: The Ride opened at Universal Studios Singapore.
- 14 to 18 December – A major disruption for the MRT, one of the worst disruptions in Singapore's history, which include:
  - 14 December – Circle MRT line partially disrupted for six hours.
  - 15 December – North–South MRT line partially disrupted for four hours.
  - 17 December – North–South MRT line partially disrupted for seven hours; the following day, this and East–West MRT line begin operation at 10 am. East–West MRT line resumed operations at 11am and North–South MRT line resumed operations at 12pm.
- 15 December – The first Abercrombie and Fitch store, known for its topless models, opened in Orchard Road.
- 21 December – The Media Development Authority (MDA) awards the FM92.0 frequency to Singapore Press Holdings (SPH) under SPH Unionworks (now SPH Radio). It will broadcast programmes related to women and family, which will start broadcasting by late 2012. Due to underwhelming concepts, the MDA will award the FM89.3 frequency at a later date to allow more time for better proposals.
- 23 December – Flash floods hit the Orchard Road area again.
- 30 December – The Junction 10 and Ten Mile Junction LRT station reopens.

== Deaths ==
- 13 April – Leong Yoon Pin, composer (b. 1931).
- 8 June – Nasir Jalil, footballer (b. 1955).
- 14 June – Tan Jing Quee, former Barisan Sosialis candidate for Kampong Glam Constituency in the 1963 General Election and political detainee (b. 1939).
- 15 June – Venerable Long Gen, 7th President of the Singapore Buddhist Federation and 4th Chief Abbot of Kong Meng San Phor Kark See Monastery (b. 1921).
- 9 July – Lee Kip Lin, architect, professor and author (b. 1925).
- 3 August – Li Lienfung, prolific writer (b. 1923).
- 31 August – Paul Abisheganaden, musician (b. 1914).
- 1 September – Chen Say Jame, former trade unionist, political detainee and short-time Assistant Secretary-General of the People's Action Party (b. 1932).
- 12 September – Choo Siu Heng, PAP stalwart and political activist (b. 1930).
- 28 September – Ridzwan Dzafir, civil servant and economic pioneer (b. 1927).
- 29 October – Tan Eng Joo, prominent businessman, rubber industry leader and Chinese community leader (b. 1919).
- 7 December – Teresa Hsu, social worker (b. 1898).
