= 2009 in Singapore =

- Decades: 1980s; 1990s; 2000s; 2010s; 2020s
- See also: Other events of 2009; Timeline of Singaporean history

The following lists events that happened during 2009 in the Republic of Singapore.

== Incumbents ==
- President: S. R. Nathan
- Prime Minister: Lee Hsien Loong

== Events ==
=== January ===
- 1 January –
  - The smoking ban is extended to all children's playgrounds, exercise areas, markets, underground and multi-storey carparks, ferry terminals and jetties, and also non-air conditioned areas in offices, factories, shops, shopping complexes and lift lobbies.
  - The SDPC marking for cigarettes takes effect.
- 9 January to 7 October – The mass EZ-Link card replacement exercise is initiated. Supposed to end by 30 September, the replacement is extended to 7 October.
- 10 January – The official logo of the 2010 Summer Youth Olympics was unveiled.
- 19 January – President S. R. Nathan allowed the spending of past reserves to mitigate the 2008 financial crisis. The money was returned in 2011.
- 28 January – The Social Development Unit and the Social Development Service have merged into SDU-SDS, the change was first announced during the 2008 National Day Rally.

=== February ===
- 11 February – Plans for a River Safari are announced by Wildlife Reserves Singapore, which will be completed by 2011. The attraction will raise awareness of freshwater habitats.
- 12 February – The Singapore Tourism Board launched a year-round campaign to attract tourists.
- 28 February – The Joo Koon extension of East West MRT line was opened, which are Pioneer and Joo Koon.

=== March ===
- March – Yew Tee Point is opened to the public.
- 4 March – Kim Chuan Depot is officially opened as the world's biggest underground train depot. The depot will serve the Circle MRT line and the Downtown MRT line.
- 8 March – The Upper Paya Lebar underpass is opened to traffic.
- 23 March – Amendments to the Films Act are passed to allow some political films if the films present a factual and objective picture, and do not dramatise and/or present a distorted picture. This comes after all party political films were banned in 1998.
- 24 March – MediaCorp, along with five Southeast Asian television broadcasting companies have formed the Smart Alliance.
- 28 March –
  - Iluma (now Bugis+) is opened to the public.
  - Landmarks around Singapore switched off their lights in support of Earth Hour.

=== April ===
- 1 April –
  - Tampines 1 opens to the public as the third mall in Tampines.
  - Bus and train fares have reduced by 4.6%.
  - Lim Hwee Hua becomes the first woman to serve in Singapore's Cabinet.
- 9 April – UNIQLO opens its first store in Singapore, located at Tampines 1.
- 13 April –
  - 154 people fall victim to the food poisoning involving an Indian rojak stall at the Geylang Serai temporary market, with one miscarriage and two deaths; the incident became one of Singapore's worst mass food poisoning cases until in 2018, when four simultaneous cases occurred.
  - The Public Order Act is passed to regulate assemblies, and allows for 'move on' orders.
- 14 April –
  - The Ministry of Education announced changes to improve primary school education.
- 27 April – The Sustainable Singapore Blueprint is launched.
- 28 April to 8 July – 2009 flu pandemic in Singapore:
  - 28 April – Ministry of Health elevated the country's Disease Outbreak Response System (DORS) from green to yellow alert, following the 2009 swine flu pandemic in various countries.
  - 30 April to 11 May – Ministry of Health raised the level to orange even though there are no human cases of swine flu in Singapore recorded, before lowering it to yellow.
  - 27 May – Singapore's first H1N1 case was confirmed.
  - 28 May – Three cases were confirmed (total 4).
  - 31 May – One case was confirmed (total 5).
  - 1 June – Two cases were confirmed (total 7).
  - 2 June – One case was confirmed (total 8).
  - 3 June – Three cases were confirmed (total 11).
  - 4 June – One case was confirmed (total 12).
  - 5 June – Two cases were confirmed (total 14).
  - 6 June – One case was confirmed (total 15).
  - 9 June – Three cases were confirmed (total 18).
  - 11 June – Three cases were confirmed (total 21).
  - 12 June – Six cases were confirmed (total 27).
  - 13 June – Seven cases were confirmed (total 34).
  - 14 June – Six cases were confirmed (total 40).
  - 15 June – Seven cases were confirmed (total 47).
  - 16 June – Two cases were confirmed (total 49).
  - 17 June – 17 cases were confirmed (total 66).
  - 18 June – 11 cases were confirmed, with one of the additional cases possibly Singapore's first unlinked local H1N1 flu case (total 77).
  - 19 June – 26 cases were confirmed, including 3 local cases (total 103).
  - 20 June – 23 cases were confirmed, one of which includes an Asian Youth Games athlete from the Philippines (total 126).
  - 21 June – 16 cases were confirmed (total 142).
  - 22 June – 26 cases were confirmed (total 168).
  - 23 June – 26 cases were confirmed (total 194).
  - 24 June – 26 cases were confirmed (total 220).
  - 25 June – 95 cases were confirmed (total 315).
  - 26 June – 50 cases were confirmed (total 365).
  - 27 June – 89 cases were confirmed (total 454).
  - 28 June – 145 cases were confirmed (total 599).
  - 29 June – 30 cases were confirmed (total 629).
  - 30 June – 72 cases were confirmed (total 701).
  - 1 July – MOH announces that it moves on from Containment to Mitigation Phase; with 82 cases confirmed (total 783).
  - 2 July – 95 cases were confirmed (total 878).
  - 3 July – 91 cases were confirmed (total 969).
  - 4 July – 34 cases were confirmed (total 1003).
  - 5 July – 52 cases were confirmed (total 1055).
  - 6 July – 56 cases were confirmed (total 1111).
  - 7 July – 106 cases were confirmed (total 1217).
  - 8 July – MOH announced that they ceased recording the number of cases.

=== May ===
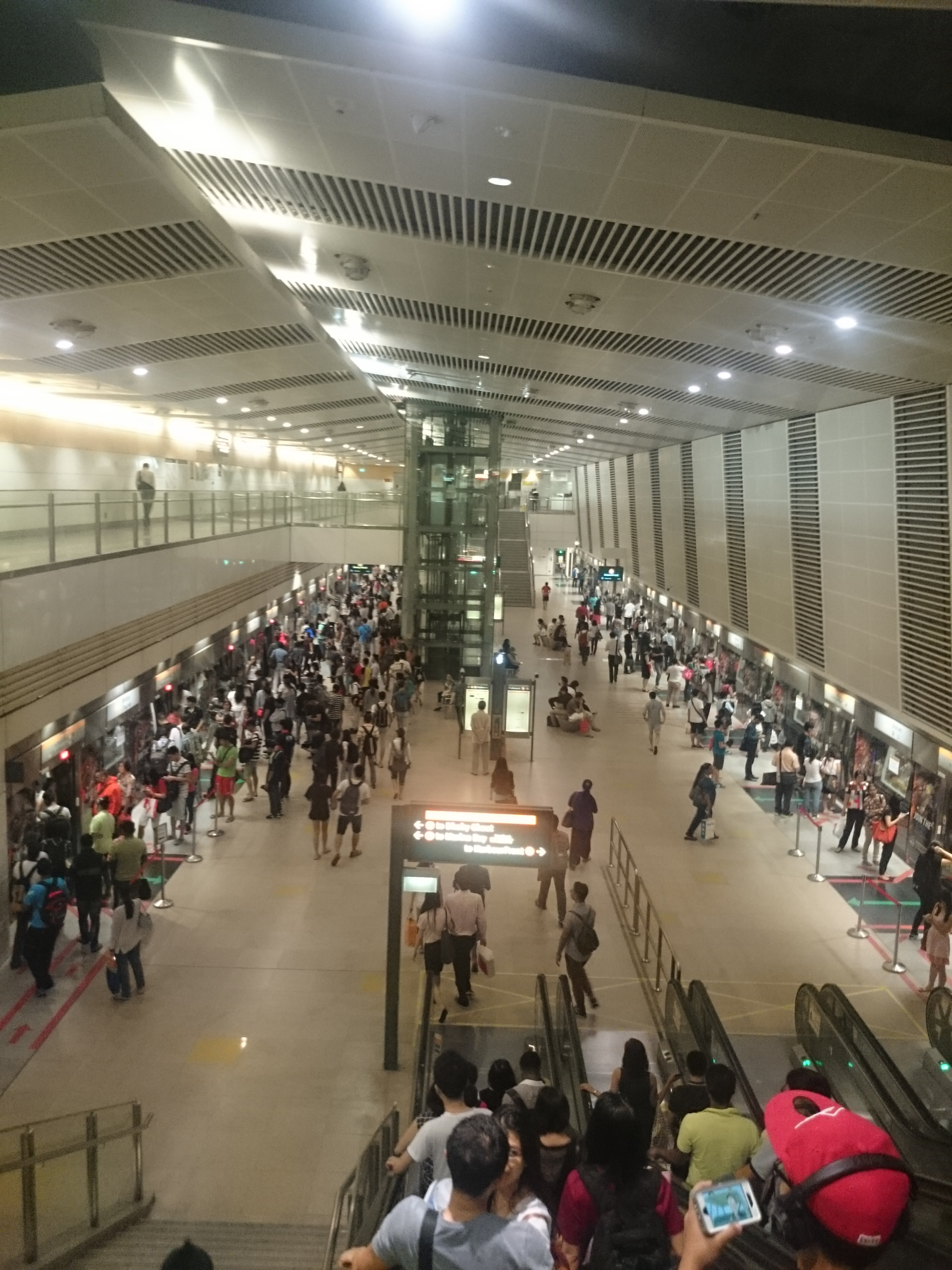
Stage 3 of the Circle MRT line

- 2 May – In a meeting at Suntec Singapore Convention and Exhibition Centre, the AWARE saga reached its head, more than one month after its dramatic takeover. The old guard is re-elected into power.
- 8 May – The authorities reported the capture of Mas Selamat bin Kastari, Singapore's Jemaah Islamiyah (JI) leader who escaped from Whitley Road Detention Centre on 27 February 2008. He was arrested in Johor, Malaysia on 1 April 2009.
- 13 May – SingTel launches inSing.com, a lifestyle portal about things in Singapore.
- 16 May – The first Pink Dot is held to promote love.
- 19 May – The Ministry of Education announced the setting up of three new education institutions to allow more students to pursue degrees. They are the Singapore Institute of Applied Technology (now known as Singapore Institute of Technology); which will work with foreign universities, Singapore's fourth university and a third medical school in Nanyang Technological University.
- 20 May – Lee Li Hui, Esther Tan and Jane Lee successfully conquered Mount Everest, followed by Joanne Soo and Lee Peh Gee on 22 May. A sixth member, Sim Yi Hui did not complete the final climb. This makes it Singapore's first all-female team to conquer Mount Everest.
- 23 May – Malaysia proposes to build the third crossing bridge connecting Pengerang in the eastern of Johor to Changi in Singapore.
- 27 May – The new LASALLE College of the Arts campus is officially opened.
- 28 May – The first phase of the Circle MRT line which consist of stations from Bartley to Marymount, is opened.

=== June ===
- 3 June – Singapore commemorates 50 years of self-governance.
- 11 June – JurongHealth is formed to cater to patients living in Western Singapore, making it the fourth health cluster.
- 16 June – The Ministry of Information, Communications and the Arts says it will be enhancing and extending the Wireless@SG programme until March 2013.
- 23 June – The Changi Water Reclamation Plant is officially opened.
- 29 June to 7 July – Singapore hosts and participates in the 2009 Asian Youth Games. The final tally was 9 gold, 6 silver and 15 bronze medals.
- 30 June – StarHub ceases transmission through analogue set-top boxes as it goes fully digital.

=== July ===
- 1 July –
  - The Civil Aviation Authority of Singapore is reconstituted as a result of Changi Airport's corporatisation. As a result, Changi Airport Group is formed.
  - The Preservation of Monuments Board (PMB) is merged into the National Heritage Board.
- 2 July – Orchard Central is officially opened.
- 6 to 10 July – The 9th World Convention of the International Confederation of Principals 2009 is held at Suntec International Convention and Exhibition Centre.
- 21 July – ion Orchard is opened to the public.
- 28 July – The Sentosa Boardwalk starts construction. At 620 metres long, it is Southeast Asia's longest themed walkway.

=== August ===
- 11 August – The first incineration plant, Ulu Pandan Incineration Plant, is closed after operating since 1979.
- 15 August – The Public Transport Security Command is formed as a transit police unit of the Singapore Police Force.
- 18 August – The Agency for Integrated Care is formed to handle the care sector.
- 20 August – Two Continuing Education and Training (CET) campuses will be built in Singapore. To be located in Paya Lebar and Jurong, the two campuses will be completed by 2013.

=== September ===
- 10 to 13 September – Singapore participates in the 2009 Asian Youth Para Games held in Tokyo. The final tally was 4 gold medals and 1 silver medal.
- 11 September – The film Singapore Rebel is allowed with an M18 rating after being previously banned in 2005. This comes after amendments to the Films Act passed earlier in March.
- 13 September – The Singapore Cable Car is closed for retrofitting and major upgrading.
- 19 September – City Square Mall is opened to the public as Singapore's first eco mall.
- 25 September – Reclamation works on Jurong Island are completed.
- 28 September – The Duke–NUS Medical School as well as the Khoo Teck Puat Building are officially opened, making it Singapore's second medical school.

=== October ===
- 7 and 14 October – Construction Worker Wu Huixin participated and won the $200,000 in the Singaporean Chinese version of the game show Don't Forget the Lyrics!, making Wu the second-known biggest winner in any Singaporean game show history.
- 9 October – NETS launches the NETS FlashPay card as an alternative to the EZ-Link card.
- 16 October – The SDU-SDS entity is now renamed to the Social Development Network (SDN) to effectively encourage marriages. In addition, SDN programmes will be opened to the public, which are previously open to members only.
- 22 October – A new SAFRA clubhouse is officially opened in Jurong. Also in, plans are unveiled to redevelop and expand the Toa Payoh clubhouse by 2013, as well as a sixth clubhouse in Punggol by 2016 and seventh clubhouse in Choa Chu Kang in 2022.
- 24 October – Dhoby Ghaut Green is officially opened as an urban park.
- 26 October – A new Zero-Energy Building (ZEB) is launched at the BCA Academy as part of the first Singapore Green Building Week, costing S$11 million. This project makes it the building in Southeast Asia to be retrofitted with green technologies.
- 29 October – Singapore's fourth university is named as the Singapore University of Technology and Design, which will eventually be located near Changi Business Park.

=== November ===
- 2 November – The Keppel Seghers Tuas Waste-to-Energy Plant commenced operations.
- 11 November – China offers a 10-year loan of two giant pandas to Singapore.
- 14–15 November – Singapore hosted the APEC Singapore 2009 conference.
- 19 November – Flash floods hit Bukit Timah after rainfall of high intensity hit, with it being dubbed a '1 in 50 year' flood.

=== December ===
- 3 December – 313@Somerset opens in Orchard Road.
- 5 December – The Ministry of Defence announced major changes to the National Service Basic Military Training and medical classification from 2010.
- 8 December – Singapore National Olympic Council announced that Singapore will not host the 2013 Southeast Asian Games due to a delay in opening Singapore Sports Hub.
- 9 to 18 December – Team Singapore participated in the 2009 Southeast Asian Games in Laos.
- 21 December – The Committee for Private Education is formed to regulate the private education industry.
- 27 December – The largest air-conditioned bus interchange in Singapore, Boon Lay Bus Interchange, opens.

== Deaths ==
- 30 March – Foong Choon Hon, former newscaster (b. 1929).
- 31 March – Choor Singh, Supreme Court judge (b. 1911).
- 11 April
  - Richard Stanley, CEO of DBS Bank (b. 1961).
  - Yuen Swee Hong, murder victim of Wang Wenfeng (b. 1951).
- 21 April – Phay Seng Whatt, 8th Chairman of the Public Service Commission (b. 1921).
- 14 June – Sia Kah Hui, former PAP Member of Parliament for Upper Serangoon Constituency and Paya Lebar Constituency (b. 1923).
- 23 June – Ong Lian Teng, former Barisan Sosialis legislative assemblyman for Bukit Panjang Constituency (b. 1935).
- 8 July – Maria Hertogh, notable for being the centre of the Maria Hertogh riots (b. 1937).
- 11 August – Ong Tjoe Kim, founder of Metro stores (b. 1911).
- 21 August – Rex Shelley, author (b. 1930).
- 27 August – Noris Ong Chin Guan, ex-Nominated Member of Parliament (b. 1949).
- 15 November – Chow Chiok Hock, former PAP Member of Parliament for Ulu Pandan Constituency (b. 1937).
- 24 November – Vernon Palmer, newscaster (b. 1925).
- 13 December – Sha'ari Tadin, former PAP Member of Parliament for Kampong Chai Chee Constituency (b. 1932).
