= Greenford High School =

Location
- Lady Margaret Road; Southall, Greater London, UB1 2GU; England; 51°31′52″N 0°22′10″W

Information
- Type: Foundation school
- Motto: Learning To Succeed
- Established: 1939
- Local authority: Ealing
- Department for Education URN: 101940 Tables
- Ofsted: Reports
- Headteacher: Mia Pye
- Gender: Mixed
- Age: 11 to 19
- Enrolment: c. 1800 (Whole School) As of August 2016
- Website: http://www.greenford.ealing.sch.uk/

Greenford High School (abbreviated as GHS) is a mixed 11-19 secondary school with a comprehensive intake located in the London Borough of Ealing.

== History ==
=== Grammar school ===
When it was built, in 1939, the then Greenford County School was a grammar school for boys and girls. It served the needs of the rapidly growing population of the western edge of the Municipal Borough of Ealing and was provided by Middlesex County Council.

=== Second World War ===
The school and Drayton Manor County School (now Drayton Manor High School) together were evacuated to Torquay in Devon in late October 1940. Ealing was being increasingly heavily bombed. The Greenford headteacher was Mr JW Withrington. From October 1941 the two schools were taught together at Audley Park School, now Torquay Academy.

=== Comprehensive ===
It remained a selective county school until 1974, when the new London Borough of Ealing reorganised to a comprehensive system, and the school undertook expansion to cope with greater numbers of pupils and the raising of the school leaving age. In 1992, Greenford High School became a grant maintained school; the change was made in order to keep its sixth form, which was threatened by proposed reorganisation of post-16 education. The following year, the roll increased again when Year 7 students were admitted to the school for the first time since 1974. Greenford High School is now a foundation school, which has over 1600 students on roll, with over 550 in the new sixth form. In addition to this there is a School Governing Body made up of 16 members. Consisting of staff, parents, LEA and community School Governors. The chair of Governors is Sunny Chana and the vice chair of Governors is Shital Manro.

The head teacher from 1991 to 2008 was Kate Griffin, a former President of the Association of School and College Leaders and formerly President of the International Confederation of Principals, the first British head elected to lead the worldwide organisation representing headteachers. (She was also an additional member of the Headmasters' and Headmistresses' Conference (HMC), a board member of the Catholic Education Service and a fellow of the Royal Society of Arts). Kate Griffin retired on 31 December 2008 and was replaced by Mathew Cramer, who was formerly a deputy head teacher at Greenford High School. In mid 2019 Ms Mia Pye took over Mathew's leadership to present.

Greenford High School now occupies a suite of buildings completed September in 2007 in mini-campus style whilst the former buildings were demolished to provide up to date sports facilities. In this mini campus style school there are 9 buildings, A for Aristotle, B for Brunel, C for Curie, D for Dickens, E for Escher, F for Fitzgerald, G for Gavaskar, H for Hawking (dining hall, which was from the original Greenford high school site just refurbished) and the new purpose-built I-block built for the year 7's and select year 8's and sixth form.

The school is one of the most ethnically mixed in Ealing, and includes students from a wide variety of cultural backgrounds; Bangladeshi, Somali, Indian, Afro-Caribbean, Pakistani, English and Irish, including students from many faiths, such as Sikhs, Hindus, Muslims, and Christians.

== Language specialism ==
A variety of languages are offered within the school: Spanish, French and German. There are a variety of assessment and accreditation opportunities, not just GCSE. The "Certificate in Business Language Competence" has proved very successful amongst Advanced Vocational Business students in the Sixth Form.

== Notable former pupils ==
- Bukayo Saka – English professional footballer
- Sir Brian Bender KCB – senior civil servant (Permanent Secretary, Department for Business, Enterprise and Regulatory Reform 2007–2009), attended Greenford County Grammar School
- Tim Lott – author, attended Greenford County Grammar School 1967–1973
- Jermaine Beckford – football pundit and professional footballer
- Paul Merson – professional footballer
- Geoffrey Burnstock – autonomic neuroscientist and Fellow of the Royal Society
- Naomi Dattani – Middlesex Women cricketer
- Imran Qayyum – Kent CCC cricketer
