= 2012 in Singapore =

- Decades: 1990s; 2000s; 2010s; 2020s
- See also: Other events of 2012; Timeline of Singaporean history

The following lists events that happened during 2012 in the Republic of Singapore.

== Incumbents ==
- President: Tony Tan Keng Yam
- Prime Minister: Lee Hsien Loong

== Events ==
=== January ===
- 10 January –
  - Li Hongyang dies after collapsing during training.
  - A report on ministerial salaries was released, which provides for cuts. The report was debated in Parliament from 16 to 18 January.
  - Seletar Airport's new control tower and extended runway are commissioned, with the third phase of Seletar Aerospace Park starting development soon. An Instrument Landing System will be put in place by 2014 to allow for operations in all weather conditions and at night.
- 14 January – Opening of Circle Line Extension (CCLe), extending from Promenade MRT station to Bayfront and Marina Bay MRT station.
- 15 January – The Ministry of Health launched a new health scheme known as the Community Health Assist Scheme (CHAS), which has Blue and Orange Cards. This will help the low and middle income get affordable healthcare.
- 28 January – The Woodsville Tunnel opens to traffic, relieving congestion along Woodsville Interchange.

=== February ===
- 16 February – Opening of the last two hotels in Resorts World Sentosa, Equarius Hotel and Beach Villas.

=== March ===
- 8 March – The Kindness Gallery is opened.
- 9 March – Lemon Laws are passed in Parliament to protect consumers from defects. The laws come into effect on 1 September.
- 15 March – A 12-hour train disruption occurs on the North East MRT line from HarbourFront to Dhoby Ghaut, after an overhead catenary wire snapped.
- 17 March – The revamped Bishan-Ang Mo Kio Park is opened, transforming the park from a canal to a naturalised floodplain.
- 22 March – MAX Atria @ Singapore Expo opens as part of an expansion to Singapore Expo. It caters for changing needs of meetings, incentives, conferencing, exhibitions (MICE) participants and is an environmentally-friendly building. In addition, it is the first venue to provide free WiFi for participants.

=== April ===
- 1 April – The Jurong Bird Park Panorail is closed.
- 2 April – JCube is opened in Jurong East.
- 6 April – Singapore Airlines flies the Boeing 747 for the last time.
- 11 April – The Singapore Institute of Technology unveils the designs for its Polytechnic campuses, unveiling a new logo too. The campuses, which will incorporate environmentally friendly features, will be completed by 2014.
- 17 April – Dominique Lee dies after an allergic reaction was triggered by excessive grenades.
- 30 April – Rediffusion Singapore, a digital radio station, ceases broadcast.

=== May ===
- 4 May – Construction starts on the Tuas West Extension of the East–West line as well as the future new depot in Tuas. At the same time, plans are announced for more trains, being 13 trains on the North–South and East West lines by 2014, with another 22 by 2016, as well as 18 trains on the North East line from 2015. 24 more trains will be added to the Circle line from 2015, an increase of 8 from the initial plans.
- 7 May – Singapore University of Technology and Design is inaugurated by then President Tony Tan.
- 10 May – Tan Mou Sheng dies after an accident involving a Jeep.
- 26 May – A Workers' Party candidate who previously represented East Coast GRC in the 2011 Singaporean general election, Png Eng Huat, was elected as a Member of Parliament (MP) for the opposition-held Hougang SMC as a result of the by-election victory, succeeding Yaw Shin Leong, who had earlier vacated his seat on 15 February due to his expulsion from the party as a result of his party misconduct and undisclosed extra-marital affair. This was also the first by-election in nearly two decades, since the 1992 Marine Parade by-election.
- 27 May – China Architecture Design and Research Group announced the acquisition of CPG Corporation from Australian heavy engineering firm Downer Group.

=== June ===
- 4 June – Scoot, a low-cost airline, starts operations.
- 22 June – The Brompton bikes purchase was reported, sparking a controversy. As a result, the Ministry of National Development referred the case to the police. The person in charge of the purchase has since been fined S$5,000.
- 26 June – City Harvest Church Criminal Breach of Trust Case: President and senior pastor of City Harvest Church Kong Hee, along with four other leaders of City Harvest Church, were arrested and charged with misuse of funds which was heavily used under investments and Ho Yeow Sun (formerly known as Sun Ho). A sixth leader was charged on 25 July 2012. All six accused were granted bail of S$500,000 and had their passports withdrawn. At S$50 million worth of charity funds, this was the known largest misuse of charity funds in Singapore.
- 29 June – The Gardens by the Bay opens.

=== July ===
- 1 July – Mount Elizabeth Novena Hospital, a private hospital in Novena, opened its doors.
- 5 July – Singapore Institute of Technology's campus at Temasek Polytechnic, known as SIT@TP, starts construction, which will finish by 2014. The building will house the Glasgow School of Art and The Culinary Institute of America.
- 6 July – Yale-NUS College starts construction on its new campus, which will officially open in 2015.
- 18 July – Upgrades to Changi Airport Terminal 1 are completed with improvements for travellers' comfort, a dual shopping street concept, a centralised Departure Immigration Hall and viewing gallery being part of the new additions.
- 19 July – NTUC Club announced plans to upgrade Downtown East with a new resort, an expanded Wild Wild Wet and better facilities, which will be done in 5 years.
- 24 July – Singapore Institute of Technology's campus at Ngee Ann Polytechnic, known as SIT@NP, starts construction, which will finish by 2014. The building will house Newcastle University, University of Glasgow and Wheelock College.
- 27 July – 12 August – Team Singapore took part in the 2012 Summer Olympics in London. The party's final result was two bronze medals, placing 76th out of 86 NOCs.

=== August ===
- 1 August – The Media Literacy Council is formed to promote cyber wellness.
- 7 August – Singapore Institute of Technology's campus at Singapore Polytechnic, known as SIT@SP, starts construction, which will finish by 2014. The building will house the Technical University of Munich, University of Glasgow and DigiPen Institute of Technology.
- 8 August - The newly renovated Hougang 1 shopping mall is officially reopened after having 12 years of its operations and closed in October of the previous year as opened in 1999.
- 12 August – Muhammad Fahrurrazi Bin Salim dies after his body was found 200 metres from the last seen position. That took place during a training in Brunei.
- 28 August – After 15 years, Carrefour announced that it will exit the Singapore market by year-end after closing its stores in Plaza Singapura and Suntec City.
- 29 August – 9 September – Team Singapore took part in the 2012 Summer Paralympics in London.
  - 3 September – Equestrian rider Laurentia Tan wins a Paralympic bronze medal. She wins a silver medal on 5 September.
- 29 August - The Thomson line is unveiled with several changes. It will be 30 km (19 mi) long (longer by 3 km) with a total of 22 stations (up from 19 previously) and four-car trains for future demand instead of the initial three-car plan. It will connect areas like Woodlands, Sin Ming, Thomson, Orchard Road, Marina Bay and Gardens by the Bay. Instead of 2018, the line will be ready in three stages from 2019 to 2021. In addition, studies are being done for the Eastern Region line and future land transport plans.

=== September ===
- 3 September – Kiss 92FM is launched with an emphasis on women and family matters, the first radio station in Singapore to do so.
- 6 September – Giant pandas Kai Kai and Jia Jia arrived in Singapore. They will be part of the River Safari when it opens.
- 8 September – Our Singapore Conversation is launched.
- 12 September – The Ministry of Education announced that school rankings by academic results will no longer be carried out, as well as an overhaul of school awards.
- 15 September – Gillman Barracks reopens as an art cluster.
- 17 September –
  - Singapore Power announced the S$2 billion north–south and east–west cable tunnels project to house electrical cables 60m underground. When completed by 2018, the project will help boost Singapore's power system and result in less inconvenience from road works.
  - The Star Vista is opened.
- 18 September – One Raffles Place Tower Two is officially opened.
- 22 September – The Singapore Grand Prix is renewed for the first time, lasting four years until 2017.
- 25 September – Budget Terminal, one of the terminals located at the Singapore Changi Airport, ceases operation after six years of service and began demolition on 1 February 2013 to make way for Terminal 4.
- 27 September – Tan Tai Seng dies in a freak accident caused by a falling tree.
- 28 September – The second satellite blood collection centre opens in Dhoby Ghaut.
- 29 September – Sheng Siong's HQ, Warehouse and Distribution Centre is officially opened in Mandai. At the same time, an Enhanced HR Capability Toolkit is also launched at the event.

=== October ===
- 15 October – The Personal Data Protection Act is passed in Parliament to safeguard data privacy and create a do-not-call registry.
- 16 October – Plans are unveiled for seven new waterfront districts as part of Punggol's second phase, along with more amenities.
- 22 October – The Marina Bay Cruise Centre Singapore is officially opened.
- 24 October – Sky Greens's vertical farm is officially opened, making Sky Greens the first commercial vertical farm in Singapore, boosting vegetable production.

=== November ===
- 1 November –
  - The Ministry of Community Development, Youth and Sports (MCYS) and Ministry of Information, Communications and the Arts (MICA) are restructured into three ministries, which are the Ministry of Social and Family Development (MSF), Ministry of Culture, Community and Youth (MCCY) and Ministry of Communications and Information (MCI). It is hoped that the restructuring will be able to handle family and community issues more effectively. In addition, the National Archives of Singapore (NAS) is now under the National Library Board (NLB).
  - The Star Performing Arts Centre is opened.
- 8 November – The new Standard Ticket scheme is launched for purchase at all MRT/LRT stations with six trips allowed and lower deposits. All machines will move to the new system in March 2013.
- 14 November – The death penalty is made discretionary in some cases of murder and drug trafficking, following amendments passed to the Penal Code and Misuse of Drugs Act.
- 15 November – Sheba the polar bear (of Singapore Zoo) dies at the age of 35.
- 16 November –
  - The new Campus for Research Excellence and Technological Enterprise (CREATE) is officially opened, giving a boost for R&D activities.
  - The new Bukit Panjang Integrated Transport Hub is announced to replace the existing Bukit Panjang Bus Interchange by 2015.
- 21 November – The Ministry of Education announced that top scorers will no longer be disclosed, starting from the 2012 PSLE results.
- 26 November – 171 SMRT bus drivers conducted a strike which lasted for two days.
- 29 November – The Giant Panda Forest in River Safari is opened. The opening ceremony was held a day before.

=== December ===
- 1 December – Pacnet ceased operations of its residential internet network.
- 7 December – Resorts World Sentosa officially opens with a new 8m sculpture unveiled.
- 10 December – An accident occurred on the RSN Endurance.
- 12 December – Speaker of Parliament and MP of Punggol East SMC, Michael Palmer resigned due to an extra-marital affair.
- 22 December – The Singapore national football team wins the 2012 AFF Championship finals, winning Thailand 3–2.

== Deaths ==
- 3 February – Toh Chin Chye, 1st Deputy Prime Minister of Singapore and 1st Chairman of the People's Action Party (b. 1921).
- 4 February – Lee Hee Seng, 10th Chairman of the Public Service Commission (b. 1927).
- 29 February – Andrew Chew, 11th Chairman of the Public Service Commission (b. 1929).
- 5 March – Khoo Oon Teik, doctor and founder of National Kidney Foundation (b. 1921).
- 10 March – Tan Boon Teik, 2nd Attorney-General of Singapore (b. 1929).
- 27 March – Nalla Tan, doctor, academic and author (b. 1923).
- 2 May – Emma Yong, actress and member of Dim Sum Dollies (b. 1975).
- 8 May – Lau Teng Chuan, sportsman and sports teacher (b. 1929).
- 27 May – Mallika Jesudasan, murder victim and mother of Sujay Solomon Sutherson (b. 1956).
- 3 June – Lady Yuen-Peng McNeice, nature conservationist (b. 1917).
- 4 June – Lim Hock Siew, former Barisan Sosialis politician and ISA detainee of Operation Coldstore (b. 1931).
- 29 June – Yong Nyuk Lin, former Minister for Education, Health and Communications (b. 1918).
- 8 July – Yeo Seh Geok, former First Lady and spouse of former President Benjamin Sheares (b. 1917).
- 14 July – J. M. Jumabhoy, former Minister for Commerce and Industry (b. 1918).
- 13 August – Christopher Neo Ting Wei, Treasurer of the National Solidarity Party (b. 1963).
- 2 November – Han Suyin, physician and novelist (b. 1916).
- 24 November – Tan Chong Tee, member of Force 136 (b. 1916).
- 5 December – Chen Wencong, ex-actor and producer (b. 1970).
