= University of New South Wales Asia =

Defunct university in Singapore

Coordinates: 1.3408°N 103.9647°E

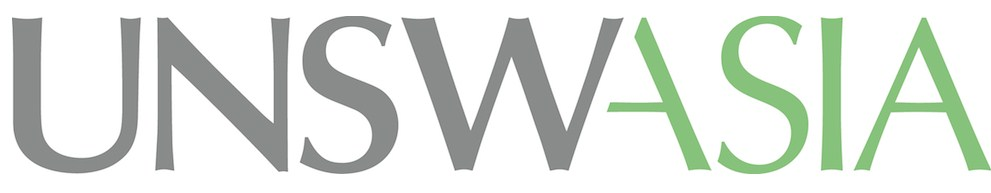
- Type: Private
- Established: 12 March 2007 (Closed 28 June 2007)
- President: Professor Greg Whittred
- Location: Queenstown, Singapore
- Website: http://www.unswasia.edu.sg *Website is no longer in operation.

The University of New South Wales Asia (Abbreviation: UNSW Asia; Chinese: 亚洲新南威尔斯大学) was the first international university campus for the University of New South Wales in Singapore which opened on 12 March 2007. UNSW Asia was the first foreign university and fifth university in Singapore.

On 23 May 2007, UNSW Asia Singapore campus announced its planned closure on 28 June 2007, at the end of the first semester due to financial issues and lower than expected student numbers. As a result of the sudden closure, rifts within the UNSW management were publicised, and accusations were exchanged between the University and the Economic Development Board. Questions were raised over the Economic Development Board's role in bringing in potentially over-ambitious business plans. The Singapore government's total loans to the university amounting to S$32 million was also revealed. The University is expected to repay all loans, and will have to restore the land for its campus to its original state, potentially incurring further costs.

== Announcement of Closure ==
UNSW announced its closure on 23 May 2007. It was reported that the closure was due to its low student enrolment, causing the school to run into financial problems. The closure came despite the fact that UNSW had already invested over S$22 million (A$17.5 million) in its Singapore campus. Students who were enrolled at UNSW Asia were offered a place in an equivalent programme at UNSW Sydney.

The students of the university petitioned against the closure of the Singapore campus. Together with the petition, they are asked for the S$140 million campus project at Changi to be abandoned to cut costs. They added they were happy with their current Kay Siang Road campus. Some said they did not mind paying their tuition fees in full to help the situation at the loss making campus. The petition was sent to the UNSW management in Sydney as well as the Ministry of Education and the Economic Development Board. Students felt the university should be given a chance and the university had a lot of potential in Singapore as well as being a force in the Asian education system. Local universities said they would admit affected students on a case-by-case basis. Scholarships were given to students to study in the UNSW Sydney campus with S$12,000 given to foreign students and S$22,000 to local students.

== Plans before Closure ==
=== Programs and research ===
As a full university, UNSW Asia was to be an English-medium institution offering undergraduate, postgraduate and research programs across multiple disciplines grouped into the two clusters, namely science, engineering and health; and commerce and humanities.

Six bachelor's degree programs were to be offered for undergraduates, namely those in science, engineering, commerce, international studies, design and media, and were to have corresponding honours courses. Undergraduates were to be able to pursue a single major or a double major program, which includes Science/Commerce, Science/Media, Science/International Studies, Commerce/International Studies, Commerce/Media, International Studies/Media, Engineering/Commerce and Engineering/International Studies. Other programs could have been added by the university in due course, such as those in medical sciences and health administration.

Emphasis was to be made on research work with the establishment of research centres, and would have involved research programs funded and conducted by members of both the Asian and Australian campuses. UNSW Asia was to specialise in research relevant to the Asian region, however, and work closely with research and industry trends in Singapore.

All degrees conferred by UNSW Asia were to be awarded by the University of New South Wales, and all academic programs of the Asian campus will be governed and treated on equal standing with those in the Australian campuses under the UNSW Council.

=== Students ===
UNSW Asia aimed to establish a high international profile by allocating at least 70% of its intake to non-Singaporeans. Applications open in January 2006 for the pioneering batch of about 500 to 600 students, and UNSW Asia began classes in March 2007. However, only 148 students were enrolled successfully. Prior to that, however, the university commenced a 40-week Foundation Studies program in January 2006 as an independent pre-university course for prospective students, including a course in the English language. Open to both Singaporeans and international students - though Singaporeans have to be above 18 and males need to complete National Service before enrolling, it initially offered courses in commerce and the physical sciences. Singaporean Students needed to have an aggregate score of below 20 for GCE 'O' Levels and a minimum of C6 for English Language. Successful completion of the course would guarantee a place in UNSW Asia, although they may also apply to enter the Australian campuses.

The university expected to have a full student population of about 15,000 after 15 to 20 years.

=== Campus ===
A site in Changi was allocated for the building of the university's permanent campus. The only university to be sited in the eastern part of Singapore, it is located between Upper Changi Road East and Changi South Avenue 1, sited next to the Changi Business Park and about 400 metres away from the Expo MRT station . The Campus can be seen on Google Maps below in the External Links.

An international design competition was held to design the campus masterplan and the library building, with acclaimed Singapore-based Kerry Hill Architects winning the competition in an announcement on 28 June 2005 . Other finalists in the competition were Singapore-based WOHA, and three Australia-Singapore partnerships of FJMT/Architects 61; BVN/RSP Architects; and CM+/Geoff Malone International.

Construction of the campus began in 2006, and the first buildings were scheduled be ready for occupation in late 2008, including the library, science/engineering building, academic/administrative building, teaching suites, research laboratories and sports facilities. While the campus was being built, the university commenced classes in 2007 at the former campus of the Republic Polytechnic at 1 Kay Siang Road in Tanglin . However, following the university's closure, the land was later allocated for Singapore's fourth publicly funded university.

== See also ==
- List of universities in Singapore
