= The Islamic Bank of Asia =

- Company type: Subsidiary
- Industry: Banking
- Founded: 7 May 2007; 19 years ago
- Defunct: 15 September 2015; 10 years ago
- Headquarters: Singapore
- Key people: Abdulla Hasan Saif, Chairman; Vince Cook, CEO
- Products: Financial services, Islamic banking
- Parent: DBS Bank
- Website: www.islamicbankasia.com

The Islamic Bank of Asia (IB Asia) was launched by DBS Bank on 7 May 2007 after receiving official approval from the Monetary Authority of Singapore for a full bank licence. IB Asia's founding shareholders include majority stakeholder DBS and 34 Middle Eastern investors from prominent families and industrial groups from Gulf Cooperation Council (GCC) countries.

== Profile ==
IB Asia is incorporated with a paid-up capital of USD500 million with DBS contributing USD250 million and holding a majority stake of 50 percent plus one share. A subsidiary of DBS, IB Asia commence operations on separate ground floor offices in DBS' headquarter facilities and will focus on commercial banking, corporate finance, capital market and private banking services.

IB Asia have an eight-member board of directors with His Excellency, Abdulla Hasan Saif, Advisor for Economic Affairs to the Prime Minister, Bahrain, as Chairman.

== Operations ==
The launch of IB Asia follows DBS' stepped-up participation in the Middle East markets. DBS has placed a significant portion of large, landmark equity IPOs and securitisations in the Middle East and was among the first few Asia-based banks to receive a banking licence from the Dubai International Financial Centre.

== Operational Issues ==
On 14 September 2015, DBS Bank has released a statement to the Singapore Exchange website that as IB Asia is unable to achieve economies of scale when it is operated as a separate entity, therefore DBS Bank would progressively cease IB Asia which was estimated to take about 2 to 3 years. In the same statement, DBS Bank will continue to develop and offers Islamic compliant banking products instead.

As of 11 July 2016, the homepage of IB Asia is not accessible.
