= CleanTech Park =

Eco-business park in Singapore

Coordinates: 1°21′06.77″N 103°41′35.64″E

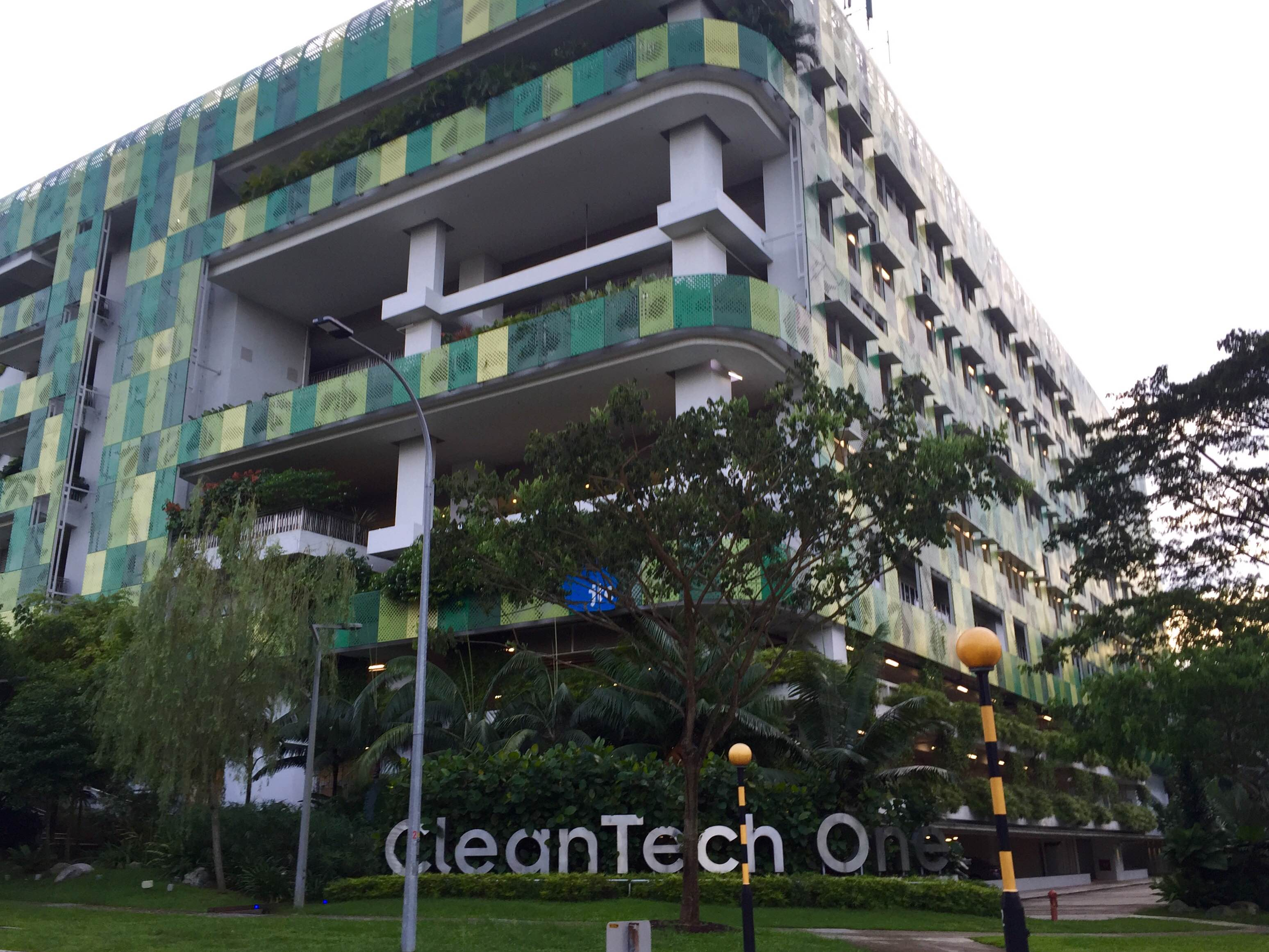
CleanTech One, the park's first multi-tenanted building

CleanTech Park is a 50 hectares (120 acres) eco-business park in the west of Singapore, developed by JTC Corporation (JTC) along Nanyang Avenue next to Nanyang Technological University (NTU). Billed as Singapore's first eco-business park, it was planned as a place where clean technologies could be test-bedded in an urbanised tropical setting. It is one of the five precincts of the Jurong Innovation District, an area of about 600 hectares master-planned by JTC.

== History ==
The idea of a clean-technology park was first proposed in 2008 by a panel of clean energy experts appointed by the Economic Development Board (EDB). JTC and the EDB unveiled the park's masterplan on 25 February 2010. The park was to be built in three phases, with completion targeted for 2030, and was expected to provide about 20,000 jobs when complete. Construction of the first phase began in May 2010.

The park's first multi-tenanted building, CleanTech One, was launched with a tree-planting ceremony in October 2010, ahead of its scheduled completion in December 2011. Construction of a second JTC building, CleanTech Two, began on 31 May 2012, with the Agency for Science, Technology and Research's Advanced Remanufacturing and Technology Centre as its anchor tenant. In November 2012 CleanTech Park became the first development to receive the Building and Construction Authority's Platinum Green Mark for Districts award. CleanTech One was officially opened by the Minister for Trade and Industry, Lim Hng Kiang, on 15 August 2013; 22 organisations had by then set up in the building.

LaunchPad @ JID, a JTC facility for start-ups in urban solutions, advanced manufacturing and engineering, was completed in the park in 2018. JTC CleanTech Three, on which construction began in 2017, was completed in June 2022. In March 2024 the engineering consultancy Surbana Jurong opened its global headquarters, the Surbana Jurong Campus, in the park.

== Buildings ==
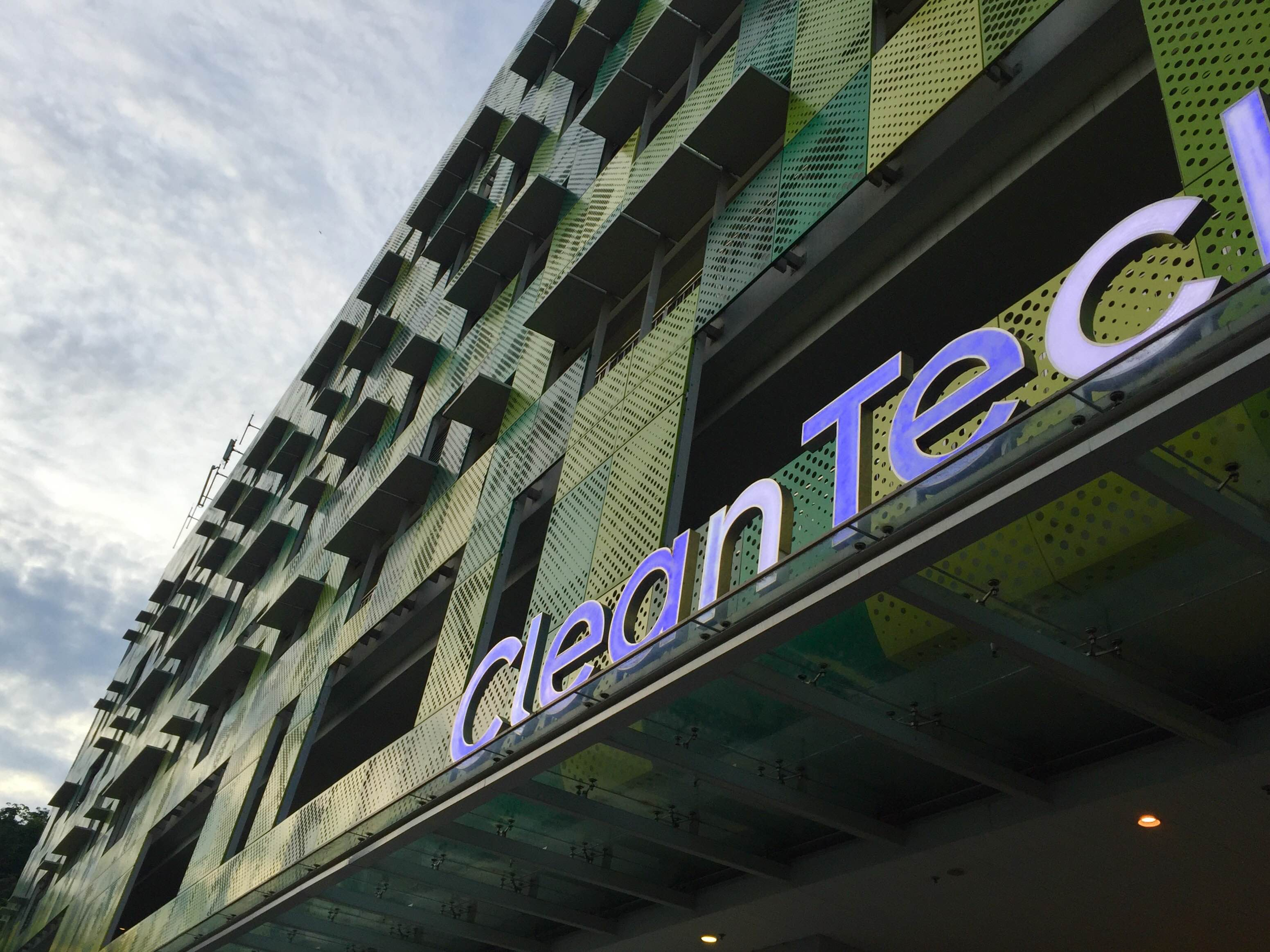
Façade of a building in the park

=== CleanTech One ===
CleanTech One is a six-storey development of two towers with more than 37,000 square metres (400,000 sq ft) of space. It was designed by Surbana International Consultants, cost S$87 million and is rated Green Mark Platinum, the highest rating of Singapore's green building scheme. Its towers have narrow east- and west-facing façades to reduce solar heat gain, a naturally ventilated atrium, and a "sky trellis" of greenery between buildings to shade the façades. Rooftop solar panels and a one-megawatt fuel cell plant supply part of its energy. Its early tenants included NTU's Nanyang Environment & Water Research Institute and Energy Research Institute @ NTU, laboratories of the Solar Energy Research Institute of Singapore, DHI Water & Environment and Toray.

=== CleanTech Two ===
CleanTech Two provides about 22,300 square metres (240,000 sq ft) of offices, laboratories and workshops on a 0.9 hectares (2.2 acres) site. It was designed for heavier floor loads, higher ceilings and greater electrical power than conventional business park space, and to be 30 per cent more energy-efficient than a typical building of its size and use. It includes dry and wet laboratories and incubation facilities for clean technology firms.

=== CleanTech Three ===
JTC CleanTech Three, designed by Architects 61, comprises eight laboratory blocks and one office block, staggered across the site's original terrain and linked by skybridges. A wildlife corridor separates one block from the other eight. The façades, of glass-fibre-reinforced concrete panels imprinted with the textures of bark, rock, terracotta and brick, take their cue from the nearby Thow Kwang dragon kiln. The building received the Green Mark Platinum award and a Merit Award in the Singapore Institute of Architects' Architectural Design Awards in 2023. Its tenants include Makino and the Bosch Rexroth Regional Training Centre.

=== Surbana Jurong Campus ===
The Surbana Jurong Campus was designed by Surbana Jurong with Safdie Architects. It consists of ten towers linked by a pedestrian pathway and enclosed courtyards, with a built-up area of 1.2 million square feet for about 4,000 employees. More than half of the site's original green space was preserved, and the campus holds the Green Mark Platinum Super Low Energy award.

== Environment ==
The park was built on a 50-hectare site of secondary forest that sloped down by almost 20 metres towards its centre. About five hectares were set aside as a green core, the Jurong Eco-Garden, which in May 2011 became the first development to receive the BCA–NParks Green Mark Platinum award for new parks. It is now known as the Potter's Garden. About 21 per cent of the native trees on the site were retained; detention ponds and a cleansing biotope slow and treat stormwater, and about 65 per cent of rainwater runoff is retained for reuse in the garden. More than 139 species of plants and animals have been recorded there, six of them of conservation interest. The site also contains two dragon kilns, Thow Kwang (1940s) and Guan Huat (1950s).

According to JTC, the park's infrastructure and public amenities were designed to save more than 40 per cent of energy and 25 per cent of potable water. A network of streams, bioswales and ponds that follows the natural terrain stores stormwater for sanitary flushing. JTC requires its own buildings in the park to achieve Green Mark Platinum and other developers' buildings at least Green Mark Gold, and runs a living lab programme under which partners can test uncommercialised sustainable solutions on site.
