= MT Bunga Kelana 3 =

History
- Name: MT Bunga Kelana 3
- Owner: AET Petroleum Tankers
- Port of registry: Malaysia, Port Kelang
- Builder: Hyundai Heavy Industries, South Korea
- Laid down: 21 April 1998
- Completed: 1998
- In service: 29 October 1998
- Identification: ABS class no: 9836140; Call sign: 9MCY6; IMO number: 9178331; MMSI no.: 533411000

General characteristics
- Type: VLCC, oil tanker
- Tonnage: 57,017 GT; 105,784 DWT
- Length: 243.827 m (799.96 ft)
- Beam: 42 m (138 ft)
- Depth: 21 m (69 ft)
- Deck clearance: 6,118 mm (240.9 in) max
- Propulsion: Single Screw, B & W
- Speed: 15 kt

MT Bunga Kelana 3 is an Aframax tanker built in 1998, owned and operated by AET Tanker Holdings, a subsidiary of Malaysian International Shipping Corporation (MISC) to transport crude oil from Bintulu, Sarawak.

== 2010 accident and oil spill ==
Bunga Kelana 3 collided with the bulk freighter, MV Waily, in the Singapore Strait, 13 km southeast of Changi Air Base (East) on May 25, 2010, at 6:10. No injuries were reported among the crew. The tanker captain said 2.000 tonnes of crude oil may have spilled into the sea. MV Waily was anchored in the Straits of Singapore. Traffic in the Straits of Singapore was not affected. The Maritime and Port Authority of Singapore (MPA) directed three ships full of oil cleaning equipment to clean up the spilled oil. Stuart Traver of Gaffney, Cline & Associates in Singapore, said the effects were minimal, and would have a different impact than the Deepwater Horizon oil spill.

== See also ==
- List of oil spills
