= MV Waily =

History

Flag of St. Vincent & The Grenadines
- Name: Waily
- Port of registry: Saint Vincent and the Grenadines
- Launched: 18 March 1983
- Completed: 1983
- Identification: IMO number: 8221478; Callsign: 3FNL2
- Fate: Scrapped 20 May 2016

General characteristics
- Tonnage: 25,449 DWT

MV Waily was a Saint Vincent and the Grenadines-flagged bulk carrier owned by Treasure Marine Ltd. The vessel was involved in a collision with the Malaysian-flagged oil tanker MT Bunga Kelana 3 on 25 May 2010 in the Singapore Strait that caused a release of 2,000 tonnes of crude oil.
