= National Climate Change Secretariat =

The National Climate Change Secretariat (NCCS) is part of the Strategy Group that supports the Prime Minister and his Cabinet, coordinating Singapore's domestic and international policies and strategies in addressing climate change. It also functions under the Inter-Ministerial Committee on Climate Change (IMCCC) which is chaired by Mr Teo Chee Hean, Senior Minister and Co-ordinating Minister for National Security.

As of November 2019, the NCSS is headed by Mr Benedict Chia (Director of Strategic Issues) and Mr Heng Jian Wei (Director of Policy and Planning). It is headquartered at 100 High Street, #03-01 The Treasury, Singapore 179434. There are two main departments: Policy and Planning and Strategic Issues. There are five other sub-departments, namely Mitigation and Resilience Policy and Planning, International Policy, Economic Research, Technology Innovation and Deployment, and Policy Innovation and Futures.

The agency has four main responsibilities. Firstly, it helps reduce carbon emissions throughout all sectors. Secondly, it assists the nation in adapting to the short-term and long-term effects of climate change. Thirdly, it seeks to tap on green growth opportunities brought about by climate change. Lastly, it promotes climate consciousness and climate action among the general public.

== History ==
The National Climate Change Secretariat (NCCS) was set up on 1 July 2010 under the Prime Minister's Office (PMO). Mr Tan Yong Soon, who has since retired from the Singapore Civil Service in October 2012, was appointed as the agency's first Permanent Secretary.

The agency was initially located in the Ministry of Foreign Affairs, but it was brought under the PMO and then headed by a Permanent Secretary in order to "reflect the important scope of policy matters to be coordinated". The strengthening of the agency came after Singapore submitted its emissions reduction targets under the Copenhagen Accord, evidence that the nation was dedicated to delivering on its commitments, both international and domestic.

== Programmes ==
=== Public Consultations ===
To date, the National Climate Change Secretariat has held 3 Public Consultation exercises with the aim of gathering public feedback and suggestions on Singapore's domestic climate change-related policies. Methods to obtain feedback and perspectives include focus group discussions, online consultations, and closed-door stakeholder dialogues.

- Public Consultation on Climate Change and Singapore (2015)
  - Suggestions and feedback were gathered from stakeholders across the private and people sectors to support efforts to develop Singapore's plan to reduce carbon emissions and promote green growth beyond 2020. This was in line with Singapore's participation in the 2015 United Nations Climate Change Conference, which led to the signing of the Paris Agreement.
- Public Consultation on Singapore's Climate Change Strategy and Carbon Tax (2017)
  - Feedback was gathered with regard to the proposed carbon tax as well as Singapore's strategy in harnessing green growth opportunities and improving carbon efficiency in all sectors.
- Public Consultation on Developing Singapore's Long-Term Low Emissions Strategy (2019)
  - The consultation targeted the republic's low carbon strategy after 2030 and it came in a year where student-led climate strikes took place around the world, including a climate rally staged in Hong Lim Park, Singapore.

=== School Outreach ===
The agency produces educational materials, such as posters, infographics, and drama programmes, aimed at raising awareness of climate change among youths in Singapore.

=== Plans and Reports ===
Based on its own research, and data collected from other agencies, the NCCS publishes plans and reports which chart Singapore's response to climate change.

== Related legislation ==
=== Carbon tax ===
It was announced at Budget 2017 by the Minister of Finance that a carbon tax would be implemented from 2019 onwards, starting from $5 per tonne of carbon dioxide equivalent. The tax applies to all facilities that emit more than 25,000 or more tonnes of carbon dioxide equivalent and is expected to increase to between $10 and $15 per carbon dioxide equivalent by 2023.

=== Coastal protection ===
During the 2019 National Day Rally Speech, Prime Minister Lee Hsien Loong predicted that it may cost Singapore at least $100 billion to protect the island from rising sea levels. Possible options for the island-nation include building polders and dykes along the eastern coastline to protect low-lying areas, and reclaiming a series of islands form Marina East to Changi, connecting them with barrages and creating a reservoir. It was also announced that a small polder was being built at Pulau Tekong to protect existing low-lying areas, and to allow the republic to gain some experience operating one.
