= Nasir Jalil =

Singaporean footballer

Personal information
- Full name: Mohamad Nasir bin Jalil
- Date of birth: 1955
- Place of birth: Singapore
- Date of death: 8 June 2011 (aged 55–56)
- Place of death: Terengganu, Malaysia

Senior career*
Years	Team	Apps	(Gls)
1977–1981	Singapore FA		
1982–1988	Terengganu FA		
1988	Balestier Central		

International career
1977–1982	Singapore		
- * Club domestic league appearances and goals

Mohamad Nasir bin Jalil (1955 – 8 June 2011) was a Singapore-born Malaysian professional football player who represented Singapore at international level in the late 1970s and early 1980s.

Nicknamed The Crazy Horse, he is remembered for scoring the late equaliser in the Malaysia Cup final in 1977 at the Merdeka Stadium when he won the first of his two Malaysia Cups. His second Malaysia Cup triumph came in 1980.

He next played for Terengganu from 1982 to 1988, finishing his football career with Balestier Central the same year. Subsequently, he became a Malaysian citizen and lived in Terengganu for the rest of his life.

== Personal life ==
On 8 June 2011, Nasir died of brain cancer, first diagnosed in 2003, at the age of 56.

His brother Nasaruddin Jalil also represented Singapore at international level. Nasir's daughter Siti Rahmah is a silat athlete for Malaysia.
