= Murder of Pan Hui =

2007 murder of a schoolgirl in Singapore

Pan Hui
- Born: Pan Hui; 1992; Jilin, People's Republic of China
- Died: 20 October 2007 (aged 15); Marsiling, Singapore
- Other name: Ong Pan Hui
- Education: Primary Six (Singapore)
- Occupation: Student
- Known for: Murder victim

Pan Hui (c. 1992 – 20 October 2007; Chinese: 潘辉; pinyin: Pān Huī) was a 15-year-old girl who was found dead on 20 October 2007 inside a rental flat in Marsiling, Singapore. 45-year-old bus driver Ong Pang Siew (born 17 August 1962; Chinese: 王邦守; Pe̍h-ōe-jī: Ông Pang-siú; pinyin: Wáng Bāngshǒu), Pan Hui's step-father, was charged with murder. It was revealed in court that after the divorce, Ong and Pan's biological mother had been arguing regarding Ong's need to visit his biological son. On the date of the killing, Ong went there to see his son and his conversation with Pan eventually escalated into an argument that led to the strangulation.

Ong was diagnosed by the defence's psychiatrist to be suffering from major depressive disorder, which impaired his mental responsibility at the time of the murder, and his prior consumption of alcohol likely also contributed to the impairment of Ong's mental state at the material time. However, the trial court rejected the defence's psychiatric evidence and ruled in favour of the prosecution's psychiatric opinion, and Ong was hence sentenced to death for murder. However, upon Ong's appeal, his conviction of murder was reduced to manslaughter on the grounds of diminished responsibility and Ong's death sentence was commuted to ten years' imprisonment.

== Background ==
Pan Hui was born in Jilin Province, China in 1992. She was the only child of her mother Xiu Yanhong and her biological father, whose name is unknown. Xiu first came to Singapore for work in 1997, divorcing her husband and gaining custody of Pan two years later.

Born in Singapore on 17 August 1962, Ong Pang Siew was the sixth of his family's twelve children, two of whom died prior to Pan's murder. He first met Xiu in 1997 while he was working as a bus driver. He and Xiu eventually developed a relationship after he went to China to meet her. In July 2002, Ong and Xiu were officially married and Pan thus became Ong's stepdaughter, taking on her stepfather's name. Xiu gave birth to Ong's biological son Cong He on 8 August 2003. Due to her poor command of English, Pan re-started her primary school education by enrolling in Primary 1 at Yishun Primary School at the age of ten. According to Ong, him and Pan "got along well".

However, by 2005, their marriage had considerably soured; Xiu had become a masseuse and started to spend more time with clients, leading to Ong to suspect she was having an affair. Pan fell out with Ong the following year, after Ong reportedly slapped her on her birthday. Eventually, Xiu moved out of the matrimonial home and lived at a rented flat in Marsiling. In May 2007, Xiu filed for divorce. The motion was granted in October 2007, with Xiu gaining full custody of Pan and joint custody of Cong.

Following the custody battle, Ong reportedly fell into a depressed state. The court allowed Ong to visit his son on weekends, but according to Subhas Anandan, Xiu often purposely made it difficult for Ong to talk with him.

== Murder ==
At around 9 pm (UTC+08:00) on 20 October 2007, soon after a beer-drinking session with friends, Ong called Xiu to inquire why he had not been allowed to see his son Cong. The conversation turned heated, and after Ong used some "nasty words", Xiu hung up. Ong called Xiu ten more times, before heading to Xiu's flat. Xiu and Cong were not at the flat at the time.

Once Ong arrived, he conversed with Pan concerning her recently acquired Singaporean citizenship and her Primary School Leaving Examinations (PSLE) test results. However, they began to argue once Ong accused Pan of caning Cong, which she denied. Ong then saw Pan pick up something beside her computer, which he believed to be a knife, leading him to a struggle.

Zhao Jing, a fellow tenant, reported seeing Ong shout "Who am I?" in Mandarin while strangling Pan and smashing her head against the floor. She called Xiu, who was heading back to the flat with Cong, followed by 999. By the time the police arrived, Pan had died. Ong was sighted sitting on her body. According to Dr Teo Eng Swee, a forensic pathologist who examined Pan's corpse, a moderate to severe degree of pressure had been applied to her neck, which also had a few superficial incisions caused by a knife; a broken blade was reportedly discovered at the scene where Pan was killed.

Before he was arrested, Ong called several people, profusely apologizing for what happened. In a call with his brother, he even claimed that he was considering suicide. Subsequently, Ong was arrested at the scene, and he was charged with murder a day later. Ong was subsequently ordered to stand trial during a preliminary hearing in May 2008.

== Trial of Ong Pang Siew ==
Ong Pang Siew
- Born: Ong Pang Siew; 17 August 1962 (age 64); Colony of Singapore
- Occupation: Bus driver (former)
- Spouse: Xiu Yanhong (m. 2002; div. 2007)
- Children: Pan Hui (step-daughter); Ong Cong He (son)
- Status: Released
- Conviction: Manslaughter (one count)
- Criminal charges: Murder (one count)
- Penalty: Death, commuted to ten years' imprisonment (2011)

On 29 September 2008, 46-year-old Ong Pang Siew stood trial at the High Court for the murder of his stepdaughter Pan Hui. Ong was represented by renowned criminal lawyer Subhas Anandan and Sunil Sudheesan, while the prosecution was led by Amarjit Singh and Diane Tan. The trial was presided by Justice Tay Yong Kwang of the High Court.

During the trial itself, Ong did not deny that he had strangled Pan, but he stated he never intended to cause her death, and his main defence was diminished responsibility. Dr Tommy Tan, a private consultant psychiatrist, testified that Ong, who had both hypertension and diabetes, was suffering from major depressive disorder (or depression) at the time of the murder. He noted that Ong exhibited several symptoms, like the loss of sleep, weight loss and loss of interest in his work during the months leading up to the murder. While his friends noted Ong was still cheerful and optimistic as usual, they noted he had lost a lot of weight prior to the killing, and there were observations from his family that Ong was getting more depressed and moody, especially since the divorce proceedings. Dr Tan also noted that Ong's family had a history of depression: Ong's parents, who both died by the time of his trial, suffered from depression and some of his siblings were also diagnosed with depression and still receiving treatment while Ong's trial was ongoing. Dr Tan stated that based on his extensive interviews with Ong and his family members and friends, he thus came to the diagnosis that Ong was suffering from depression, and his mental responsibility had been substantially impaired at the time of the murder, and Ong's behaviour of irrationally mumbling to himself and sitting on Pan's corpse was abnormal and corroborative of his psychiatric condition. Dr Tan also pointed out that Ong's intake of at least 20 cans of alcohol before the murder led to him being acutely intoxicated by alcohol at the time of the murder, and it also additionally affected his state of mind when he killed Pan.

However, the prosecution argued that Ong was a cold-blooded murderer who came to the flat with a premeditated intent to commit the murder of Pan, and stated that Ong's motive was to make sure his ex-wife could suffer from the pain of losing a loved one, after the divorce and his separation from his son and stepdaughter. The prosecution also called upon government psychiatrist Dr Jerome Goh, who claimed that Ong was not suffering from depression at the time of the murder, and also claimed that Ong's intake of alcohol would not have sufficiently impaired his mental state when he strangled Pan to death. At one point, during the prosecution's cross-examination, in which it suggested that Ong had intentionally caused the knife wounds on Pan, Ong broke down in tears as he denied doing on the stand.

On 12 March 2009, Justice Tay Yong Kwang delivered his judgement. He stated that he accepted the prosecution's arguments and psychiatric opinion, and found that Ong was not suffering from diminished responsibility at the time of the murder and he was able to act normally in spite of his supposed alcohol intoxication, and he had intentionally strangled Pan to death with a view to cause her death. Therefore, 46-year-old Ong Pang Siew was found guilty of murder and sentenced to death. Under Section 302 of the Singaporean Penal Code, the death penalty was mandated as the sole punishment for murder in Singapore.

According to Pan's mother Xiu, while she did not forgive Ong, she still hoped at least, Ong could appeal and escape the death sentence since after all, he was still her son's birth father and they used to be a couple, and she also hoped her daughter could rest in peace and not hate her stepfather for what he had done. Xiu was still saddened over her daughter's death even after a few years had passed since the case occurred.

== Ong's appeal ==
On 8 July 2010, Ong Pang Siew's appeal was heard before the Court of Appeal. The main points of the defence's appeal was that Ong was indeed suffering from diminished responsibility at the time of the murder, and they also urged the appellate court to accept the defence's psychiatric evidence. During the hearing of the appeal, the appellate court had harshly reprimanded Dr Goh for his poor assessment of Ong's psychiatric state after they reviewed his reports, before they reserved judgement to a later date.

On 8 November 2010, the Court of Appeal's three-judge panel, consisting of Chief Justice Chan Sek Keong, and two Judges of Appeal Andrew Phang and V. K. Rajah, returned with a verdict, and Justice Rajah pronounced their judgement. In the verdict, the three judges accepted that Ong was suffering from diminished responsibility when he killed Pan Hui, as a result of major depressive disorder and alcohol intoxication. Justice Rajah also stated that after comparing the psychiatric reports of Dr Tommy Tan and Dr Jerome Goh, they found that Dr Tan's evidence was more reliable and his assessment of Ong's mental state was much more complete than Dr Goh, and they first noted that throughout his assessment, Dr Goh conversed with Ong in Mandarin instead of Hokkien, which Ong was much more fluent in speaking and more comfortable to communicate with, and there could also be miscommunication on that part, which led to little rapport established between Dr Goh and Ong, in contrast to the huge rapport Ong formed with Dr Tan with their conversations being made in Hokkien.

Apart from that, Justice Rajah stated that the older Dr Tan had much more experience (15 years in total) than Dr Goh in conducting psychiatric evaluation of murder suspects during his previous employment at the Institute of Mental Health and current private practice, in contrast to the younger Dr Goh whose assessment of Ong was the first murder case he encountered during his eight-year psychiatrist career. The appellate judges also found that unlike Dr Tan, who had interviewed many of Ong's kin and friends and considered his family's medical history, Dr Goh did not inquire further on the medical history of Ong and his family, and did not further interview the other family members and friends of Ong apart from two of Ong's siblings, and this posed a huge inadequacy and lack of completeness in his medical evaluation of Ong, and therefore his reports were rejected in favour of Dr Tan's opinion. The appellate judges found that while Ong had indeed strangled Pan and killed her, it was not a case of cold-blooded or premeditated murder, but rather a case of Ong acting irrationally due to his mental state and killed Pan, and his behaviours of sitting on Pan's body, talking to himself and even calling his employer and brother about not able to work anymore and wanting to commit suicide were extremely abnormal instead of being rational.

In conclusion, Justice Rajah ruled on behalf of the three-judge panel that Ong was found not guilty of murder on the grounds of diminished responsibility, and instead, the appellate court reduced the original charge of murder to a lesser crime of culpable homicide not amounting to murder, also known as manslaughter in Singaporean legal terms. They also overturned the death sentence, and ordered that the case be remitted to the High Court for re-sentencing. The crime of manslaughter was punishable by either a jail term of up to ten years, or life imprisonment, with the offender additionally liable to caning or a fine.

Ong was reportedly grateful to his lawyer Subhas Anandan for helping him. Ong's family were reportedly glad to hear that he was spared the gallows for killing Pan. Pan's mother was also relieved but felt sad and conflicted at the same time due to the fact that her daughter had died. When she visited Ong in prison the week before, he reportedly wanted to see their son.

== Ong's re-sentencing trial ==
On 11 May 2011, Ong Pang Siew's re-sentencing trial took place before the original trial judge Tay Yong Kwang at the High Court.

The prosecution sought the maximum sentence of life imprisonment, arguing that Ong was a dangerous person who cannot be trusted with adhering to his treatment should be ever be released, and even argued that he had killed Pan Hui in cold blood and with a premeditated intent to cause her death. In rebuttal, Subhas Anandan argued that Ong should given a sentence of ten years' jail, citing Dr Tommy Tan's most recent assessment that Ong's condition was improving and he had a low risk of re-offending, and he should also continue to receive follow-up treatment. Dr Tan said Ong has very good family support and his siblings could ensure that Ong continue to seek treatment after his release, and Ong himself was often gainfully employed and he was not an aggressive person in terms of his character. Therefore, he recommended that Ong should only serve ten years instead of life in prison. Aside from the mitigation plea, the defense counsel offered their sympathy and condolences to Pan's mother for her loss.

On the same date, Justice Tay delivered his re-sentencing verdict. He stated that he made his decision based on the Court of Appeal's findings, and found that life imprisonment was too harsh for Ong, given that his actions were not as reprehensible to the extent of having to warrant such a sentence. He disagreed with the prosecution that Ong had intended to kill his stepdaughter at the time he arrived at the flat, citing that Ong was intoxicated with alcohol at that time, in addition to a depressive episode that influenced his actions and behaviour at the time of the killing, and he had acted abnormally before, during and after the crime. Justice Tay noted that Ong had been behaving himself while in prison and he regularly adhered to his medication and treatment, and his condition was improving during his incarceration, and Ong himself also provided full cooperation with the authorities. The judge also noted that despite the different opinions which the prosecution and defence had with regards to Ong's length of imprisonment, both sides did not seek caning, and he also agreed that caning was inappropriate in light of Ong's psychiatric condition.

Hence, Justice Tay decided to err on the side of leniency and sentenced 49-year-old Ong Pang Siew to ten years' imprisonment, with the sentence backdated to the date of his arrest in October 2007. Ong was reportedly relieved and smiled at the sentence and he bowed three times to the judge before he left the courtroom.

== Aftermath ==
Pan's funeral was conducted pro bono by notable undertaker Roland Tay, who was best known for providing funeral services for Liu Hong Mei and Huang Na, both murder victims in two separate cases; the cases were solved with the respective perpetrators sentenced to hang for murder. Pan's PSLE results were also released, revealing that she had scored very well in her subjects, including English, which was her weakest subject. Students and teachers offered condolences, describing Pan as a good student and friend. Pan was also said to have worried about her grades, as she wanted to be a doctor when she grew up. Pan was also remembered as a good-natured and obedient child by her family.

In 2011, the same year when Ong Pang Siew was re-sentenced to ten years in prison for the manslaughter of his step-daughter Pan Hui, Singaporean crime show In Cold Blood re-enacted the case and it aired as the ninth episode of the show's first season.

In May 2012, Ong Pang Siew's case was recalled again when the trial of Wang Zhijian, the perpetrator of the infamous Yishun triple murders of 2008, put up a defence of diminished responsibility as induced by adjustment disorder when he killed his girlfriend, her daughter and her tenant; Ong's case was cited as a successful case of diminished responsibility when compared to Wang's case. Wang was subsequently sentenced to death in December 2012 for the murder of his tenant while being convicted of manslaughter for killing his girlfriend and her daughter, although the prosecution would successfully appeal in 2014 for Wang to face two more death sentences for murdering the girlfriend and her daughter.

In 2014, Ong's former lawyer Subhas Anandan's book The Best I Could was adapted into a two-season television series, which featured his former cases. The case of Pan Hui's murder and Ong's trial was featured as the sixth episode of the show's second season. The difference was, Ong's case was not featured in the book as his trial was still ongoing at the time when Anandan first published his book in 2009. Anandan, who was interviewed in the show, stated that after Ong was sentenced to hang, he initially did not want to appeal his death sentence as he readily accepted death as the only price he should pay for killing Pan and was remorseful, but Anandan managed to persuade Ong and therefore file an appeal and successfully argued for Ong to be convicted of manslaughter.

In October 2015, Anandan's second and last book, titled It's Easy to Cry, was published nine months after Anandan died from a heart attack (although he completed writing his book before his death at age 67). Anandan, who was reported to have dictated the contents of his book while undergoing kidney dialysis, recounted the case of Ong inside the book and his experiences of defending Ong. Anandan said he felt thankful that Ong was given a jail term of ten years rather than life after the original trial judge accepted his mitigation plea that cited Ong's positive response to medical treatment, and he also stated when he saw Ong's ex-wife in court, and she did not react well to the verdict.

In 2017, the case of Ong Pang Siew was cited as one of the notable cases of defendants successfully raising the defence of diminished responsibility when charged with murder, when psychiatrists and legal experts were interviewed to discuss on the use of diminished responsibility as a defence in criminal trials in Singapore.

Since 2017, Ong Pang Siew was released from prison.

== See also ==
- Capital punishment in Singapore
- List of major crimes in Singapore
