= International Confederation of Principals =

The International Confederation of Principals (ICP) is a global association of school leadership organisations.

== History ==
ICP was founded in 1991, and operates through a council with up to three delegates from each member organisation. This meets three times in a two-year period. Council elects an executive committee to work with and support the elected president of ICP, an executive secretary services both executive and council. ICP has over 40 members, each member being a major independent organisation that supports the professional development and work of school leaders. The ICP represents school leaders across five continents; it is non-political and non-sectarian and gives a powerful international voice to school principals. Membership is open to any organisation of school leaders whose constitution contains nothing contrary to the constitution of the ICP.

== Membership ==
Membership is open to any organisation of school leaders whose constitution contains nothing contrary to the Constitution of the International Confederation of Principals. ICP recognizes four global regions represented in the Executive: Americas, Europe, Africa and Asia/Oceania. ICP maintains relationships with several regional Principal umbrella-organizations as ESHA (Europe) and ACP (Africa).

== Conventions ==
ICP holds a biennial international convention drawing together school principals from all over the world for dialogue and professional development.

Previous conventions were held in the following locations:

- 2025 (Dehli), India
- 2023 (Rovamiemi), Finland
- 2021 (Singapore)
- 2019 (Shanghai), China
- 2017 (Ireland)
- 2015 (Helsinki), Finland
- 2013 (Cairns), Australia
- 2011(Toronto), Canada
- 2009 Singapore, Singapore
- 2007 Auckland, New Zealand
- 2005 Cape Town, South Africa
- 2003 Edinburgh, Scotland
- 2001 Gyeongju, Korea
- 1999 Helsinki, Finland
- 1997 Boston, United States
- 1995 Sydney, Australia
- 1993 Geneva, Switzerland

== Leadership ==
The current President is Leendert Jan Veldhuyzen, The Netherlands

== Executive 2025 ==
- Ms. Nancy Brady (OPC) President Elect
- Mr. Matthew Johnson (ASEPA) General Representative
- Ms. Sofía Hughes Executive Secretary
- Ms. Magdalena Kassis (BCPVPA) Americas Representative
- Ms. Leanne Otene (NZPF) Asia and Oceania Representative
- Mr. Welcome Mhlanga (EPA) Africa Representative
- Mr. Damian White (IPPN) Europe Representative

== Past Presidents ==
Leendert Jan Veldhuyzen, The Netherlands • (2022-2024) Dr. Peter Kent, United Kingdom • (2022-2023) Alta van Heerden, South Africa • (2019-2021) Fiona Forbes, Australia • (2017-2018) Ari Pokka, Finland • (2015-2016) Lisa Vincent, Canada • (2013-2014) Virginia O’Mahony, Ireland • (2011-2012) Andrew Blair AM, Australia • (2009-2010) Kathleen Griffin, United Kingdom • (2007-2008) David Wylde, South Africa • (2005-2006) Nola Hambleton, New Zealand • (2003-2004) Ken Ahn, South Korea • (2001-2002) Antero Penttilä, Finland • (1999-2000) Jack Delaney, USA • (1997-1998) Rob Mc Conchie, Australia • (1995-1996) Jean Jacques Streuli, Switzerland • (1990-1994)

== Life Members ==
Current Life Members are: Peter Kent (UK) • President (2022-2023) Michael Hall (Australia) • Executive Member Maria Doyle (Ireland) • Europe Representative (2019-2023) Alta van Heerden (South Africa) • President (2019-2021) Sheree Vertigan AM (Australia) • Executive Secretary (2014-2022) Fiona Forbes (Australia) • President (2017-2018) Rob Nairn (Australia) • Executive Member Ari Pokka (Finland) • President (2015-2016) Lisa Vincent (Canada) • President (2013-2014) Virginia O’Mahony (Ireland) • President (2011-2012) Andrew Blair AM (Australia) • President (2009-2010) Kathleen Griffin (United Kingdom) • President (2007-2008) David Wylde (South Africa) • President (2005-2006) Vicki Shannon (Canada) • Executive Member Sean Cottrell (Ireland) • Executive Member Belinda Charles (Singapore) • Executive Member Edie Jacobs (South Africa) • Executive Member Nola Hambleton (New Zealand) • President (2003-2004) Ken Ahn (South Korea) • (2001-2002) Antero Penttilä (Finland) • (1999-2000) Jack Delaney (United States of America) • President (1997-1998) Rob McConchie (Australia) • President (1995-1996) Jean- Jacques Streuli (Switzerland) • President (1990–1994)

== Service to ICP (Special Award) ==
Paul Byrne (Ireland – IPPN) awarded 2023 Dr Indu Khetarpal (India – Salwan Education Trust) awarded 2022 Clive Byrne (Ireland) awarded 2022 Tsutomi Shiozaki (Japan) awarded 2017
