= List of banks in Singapore =

The following is a list providing an overview of banks in Singapore. Banks in the country operate under the supervision of the Monetary Authority of Singapore (MAS), the country’s central bank and financial regulator. All banks are licensed under the Banking Act and are classified into, Full banks, Qualifying full banks (QFBs), Wholesale banks, Offshore banks and Digital banks

As of 2026, MAS records include, 20 full banks, 10 qualifying full banks, 95 wholesale banks, 37 offshore banks, 6 local banks and 3 digital full banks.

== Recent developments ==
As of early 2026, Singapore's banking sector remains one of the most developed and well-capitalised financial systems in Asia, with total assets of major domestic banking groups exceeding S$1.9 trillion combined. The sector is dominated by the three major domestic banking groups—DBS Bank, Oversea-Chinese Banking Corporation (OCBC), and United Overseas Bank (UOB)—which play a central role in regional and global financial markets.

The sector has also undergone significant digital transformation following the issuance of digital full bank licences, with entrants such as GXS Bank, MariBank, and Trust Bank reflecting increasing competition and innovation in retail banking services.

Singapore's regulatory framework is overseen by the Monetary Authority of Singapore (MAS), which conducts monetary policy primarily through the management of the Singapore dollar exchange rate, rather than interest rates.

== Commercial banks ==
Commercial banks in Singapore may undertake universal banking, such as the taking of deposits and the provision of cheque services and lending, as well any other business authorised by the Monetary Authority of Singapore, including financial advisory services, insurance brokering and capital market services, as long as they are permitted under section 30 of the Banking Act. Since 18 July 2001, banks were no longer permitted to engage in non-financial activities.

=== Local banks ===
In the late 1990s and early 2000s, the Government of Singapore and the Monetary Authority of Singapore (MAS) implemented a series of banking liberalisation measures aimed at strengthening the competitiveness of domestic banks and encouraging consolidation within the local banking sector. These reforms included allowing selected foreign banks greater operational privileges in Singapore while maintaining regulatory safeguards for domestic financial stability.

As a result of these policy changes and subsequent industry consolidation, the number of major domestic banking groups has stabilised around a small number of large full-service banks, namely DBS Bank, Oversea-Chinese Banking Corporation (OCBC), and United Overseas Bank (UOB), which collectively dominate the domestic banking sector and have expanded significantly across the Asia-Pacific region.

==== Full banks ====
There are several locally incorporated full banks in Singapore, primarily consisting of three major banking groups. These full banks have the liberty to provide any financial service as permitted by the Banking Act.

As of MAS records, there are 6 local banks (including subsidiaries treated as separate institutions in MAS licensing data). The abbreviations used are EFA (Exempt Financial Adviser), ACU (Asian Currency Unit), and SGS (Singapore Government Securities market).

Local Full Bank		EFA	Local address	ACU	SGS
English	Other languages	EFA	Local address	ACU	SGS
Bank of Singapore (part of OCBC Bank)	新加坡银行	Yes	63 Market Street	Yes	No
DBS Bank Limited	星展银行有限公司	Yes	12 Marina Boulevard	Yes	Pri
POSB (part of DBS Bank)	新加坡邮政储蓄银行	Yes	12 Marina Boulevard	Yes	Pri
OCBC Bank	华侨银行有限公司	Yes	65 Chulia Street	Yes	Pri
United Overseas Bank Limited (UOB)	大华银行有限公司	Yes	80 Raffles Place	Yes	Pri
GXS Bank Private Limited	GXS銀行	No	3 Media Close	Yes	No

==== Digital full banks ====
Digital full banks were introduced following MAS liberalisation in 2020.

There are currently three local digital banks with full bank licence in Singapore. Trust Bank was jointly launched by FairPrice Group and Standard Chartered Singapore on 1 September 2022. GXS Bank is owned by Grab and Singtel. MariBank is owned by Sea Ltd. All are incorporated in Singapore.

Local Digital Full Bank		Ownership	Local address
English	Other languages	Ownership	Local address
Trust Bank	优信银行	FairPrice Group, Standard Chartered Singapore	77 Robinson Rd, #25-00, Robinson 77, 068896
GXS Bank	GXS数码银行	Grab, Singtel	3 Media Close, #09-03, 138498
MariBank	马里银行	Sea Ltd	1 Fusionopolis Walk, #15-01, South Tower Solaris, 138628

==== Defunct banks ====
English name	Other language name	Closed	Fate
Bank of Singapore	新加坡银行	-	Merged into Oversea-Chinese Banking Corporation and renamed Singapore Island Bank. Not to be confused with the current Bank of Singapore which is renamed from ING Asia Private Bank.
Chung Khiaw Bank Limited	崇僑銀行有限公司	1999	Merged into United Overseas Bank
Far Eastern Bank Limited	远东银行有限公司	2017	Merged into United Overseas Bank
Industrial and Commercial Bank Singapore Limited	工商银行有限公司	2002	Merged into United Overseas Bank
International Bank of Singapore	新加坡国际银行有限公司	1984	Merged into Overseas Union Bank
Keppel Bank Limited	吉宝银行有限公司	1998	Merged with Keppel TatLee Bank
Keppel TatLee Bank Limited	吉宝达利银行有限公司	2001	Merged into Oversea-Chinese Banking Corporation
Kwong Yik Bank	新嘉坡廣益銀行	1913	Voluntary liquidation after a bank run
Overseas Union Bank Limited	华联银行有限公司	2002	Merged into United Overseas Bank
Tat Lee Bank Limited	达利银行有限公司	1998	Merged with Keppel TatLee Bank
The Islamic Bank of Asia	亚洲伊斯兰银行	2015	Merged into DBS Bank

=== Foreign banks ===
Foreign banks operate under MAS licences and are classified as Full, Wholesale, or Offshore banks. There are presently 119 foreign commercial banks in Singapore, of which 28 are Full banks, 54 are Wholesale banks, and 37 are Offshore banks.

==== Full banks ====
Although foreign banks with full bank licences can also offer most commercial banking services to clients compared to local banks, they are subject to restrictions on the number of branches and automated teller machines they may operate under MAS regulations.

Based on MAS Financial Institutions Directory listing, the table lists the foreign full banks that are operating in Singapore.

Foreign full Bank		EFA	Incorporated in	Local address	ACU	SGS
English	Local language	EFA	Incorporated in	Local address	ACU	SGS
Standard Chartered Singapore	渣打新加坡有限公司	Yes	Singapore	8 Marina Boulevard	Yes	No
Bangkok Bank Public Company Limited	ธนาคารกรุงเทพ	No	Thailand	180 Cecil Street	Yes	No
Bank of America, National Association	美国银行	Yes	United States	50 Collyer Quay	Yes	Pri
Bank of China Limited	中国银行股份有限公司	Yes	People's Republic of China	4 Battery Road	Yes	Sec
Bank of East Asia Limited, The	東亞銀行有限公司	Yes	Hong Kong SAR	137 Market Street	Yes	No
Bank of India	印度银行	Yes	India	138 Robinson Road	Yes	No
Bank of Tokyo-Mitsubishi UFJ Limited, The	三菱東京UFJ銀行	Yes	Japan	9 Raffles Place	Yes	Sec
Calyon	东方汇理银行	Yes	France	168 Robinson Road	Yes	Sec
CIMB Bank	联昌国际银行	No	Malaysia	39 Robinson Road	No	No
Citibank Singapore	新加坡花旗银行	Yes	Singapore	3 Temasek Avenue	Yes	Pri
Hongkong and Shanghai Banking Corporation Limited	香港上海滙豐銀行有限公司	Yes	Hong Kong SAR	21 Collyer Quay	Yes	No
Maybank Singapore Limited	马来亚银行	Yes	Malaysia	2 Battery Road	Yes	
Hong Leong Bank Berhad	丰隆银行	Yes	Malaysia	1 Wallich Street		
Indian Bank	இந்தியன் வங்கி	No	India	3 Raffles Place	No	No
Indian Overseas Bank	இந்தியன் ஓவர்‌ஸீஸ் வங்கி	No	India	64 Cecil Street	No	No
JPMorgan Chase Bank, National Association	摩根大通银行	Yes	United States	168 Robinson Road	Yes	Sec
Ping An Bank	平安银行	Yes	China	80 Pasir Panjang Road	Yes	Pri
PT Bank Mandiri (Persero) Tbk.	曼迪里银行	No	Indonesia	Asia Square Tower 2	Yes	No
PT Bank Negara Indonesia (Persero) Tbk.	印度尼西亚国家银行	No	Indonesia	39 Robinson Road	Yes	No
RHB Bank Berhad	兴业银行	Yes	Malaysia	90 Cecil Street	Yes	Sec
Sumitomo Mitsui Banking Corporation	三井住友銀行	Yes	Japan	3 Temasek Avenue	Yes	No
UCO Bank	优科银行	No	India	3 Raffles Place	No	No

==== Qualifying full banks ====
Qualifying Full Banks (QFBs) are foreign banks granted enhanced retail privileges under MAS liberalisation starting in 1999.

The first four licences were awarded on 20 October 1999 to ABN AMRO, Banque Nationale De Paris (now BNP Paribas), Citibank (transferred to newly locally incorporated Citibank Singapore on 28 June 2004) and Standard Chartered Bank (transferred to locally incorporated Standard Chartered Singapore in 2018). Two new licences were issued in December 2001 as part of the second phase of bank liberalisation, namely to the Hongkong and Shanghai Banking Corporation and Maybank Singapore. These QFBs were initially permitted to operate up to 15 service locations under the banking liberalisation framework introduced by MAS.

In June 2004, the QFB licence was further liberalised. QFBs are permitted to establish up to 25 service locations of which up to 10 can be branches from 1 January 2005. These banks were permitted to share their ATM networks (this was achieved with five of the QFBs through atm^{5}), and provide services via the EFTPOS network from 1 July 2002. On the same day, they are also permitted to provide the Central Provident Fund's Supplementary Retirement Scheme and Investment Scheme accounts and to accept CPF fixed deposits. In 2012, MAS announced new changes to the QFB scheme, requiring QFBs who are "important to the domestic market to locally incorporate their retail operations". Further, MAS announced in 2012 that QFBs deemed significantly rooted in Singapore and whose home jurisdictions had free trade agreements with Singapore could operate up to 50 places of business.

Qualifying Full Bank		EFA	Incorporated in	Local address	ACU	SGS
English	Local language	EFA	Incorporated in	Local address	ACU	SGS
Australia and New Zealand Banking Group Limited		Yes	Australia	1 Raffles Place	Yes	Pri
BNP Paribas		Yes	France	20 Collyer Quay	Yes	No
Citibank International Personal Bank Singapore (Citibank Singapore Limited)	新加坡花旗銀行國際個人銀行	Yes	Singapore	23 Church Street	Yes	Yes
Citibank Singapore Limited	美国花旗银行新加坡分行	Yes	Singapore	3 Temasek Avenue	Yes	No
HSBC	香港上海滙豐銀行有限公司	Yes	Hong Kong SAR	21 Collyer Quay	Yes	Pri
Maybank Singapore Limited	马来亚银行	Yes	Malaysia	2 Battery Road	Yes	Sec
Standard Chartered Singapore	渣打新加坡有限公司	Yes	Singapore	Marina Boulevard, Marina Bay Financial Centre	Yes	Pri
State Bank of India	ஸ்டேட் பேங்க் ஆப் இந்தியா	Yes	India	135 Cecil Street	Yes	No
ICICI Bank Limited		Yes	India	9 Raffles Place	Yes	No
Bank of China	中国银行	Yes	China	4 Battery Road	Yes	Sec
Industrial and Commercial Bank of China	中国工商银行	Yes	China	6 Raffles Quay	Yes	Sec

==== Wholesale banks ====
Wholesale banks serve corporate and institutional clients and cannot offer SGD retail deposits. These licences were first issued in December 2001 to replace the "Restricted Bank (RB)" licence as a reflection of the greater range of services which may be conducted by these banks. These banks may conduct the same range of services as full banks, except that they do not deal with banking activities in the Singapore Dollar, and can only have one main branch.

MAS-listed wholesale banks are listed in the table.

Wholesale Bank		EFA	Incorporated in	Local address	SGS
English	Local language	EFA	Incorporated in	Local address	SGS
Australia and New Zealand Banking Group Limited		Yes	Australia	1 Raffles Place	Sec
Scotiabank		No	Canada	10 Collyer Quay	No
Barclays Bank PLC		Yes	United Kingdom	1 Raffles Quay	Pri
Bayerische Hypo- und Vereinsbank Aktiengesellschaft		Yes	Germany	30 Cecil Street	No
BNP Paribas Private Bank		Yes	France	20 Collyer Quay	No
Mega International Commercial Bank	兆豐銀行	No	Taiwan	80 Raffles Place	No
Commerzbank Aktiengesellschaft		Yes	Germany	8 Shenton Way	Sec
Credit Suisse		Yes	Switzerland	1 Raffles Link	Pri
Deutsche Bank Aktiengesellschaft		Yes	Germany	6 Shenton Way	Pri
Dresdner Bank Aktiengesellschaft merged with Commerzbank in 2009
EFG Bank		Yes	Switzerland	25 North Bridge Road	Pri
First Commercial Bank Limited	第一商業銀行股份有限公司	No	Taiwan	77 Robinson Road	No
Fortis Bank S.A./N.V.		Yes	Belgium & the Netherlands	63 Market Street	Sec
Habib Bank Limited		No	Pakistan	3 Phillip Street	No
HSBC Private Bank (Suisse) SA		Yes	Switzerland	21 Collyer Quay	Sec
Industrial and Commercial Bank of China	中国工商银行	No	People's Republic of China	6 Raffles Quay	No
ING Bank N.V.		Yes	the Netherlands	9 Raffles Place	Sec
KBC Bank N.V.		Yes	Belgium	30 Cecil Street	No
Korea Exchange Bank	외환은행	No	South Korea	30 Cecil Street	No
Landesbank Baden-Wuerttemberg		Yes	Germany	25 International Business Park	No
Mizuho Bank Limited	みずほ銀行	Yes	Japan	168 Robinson Road	No
Moscow Narodny Bank Limited		No	United Kingdom	50 Robinson Road	No
National Australia Bank Limited		Yes	Australia	5 Temasek Boulevard	No
National Bank of Kuwait SAK	الوطني	No	Kuwait	9 Raffles Place	No
Norddeutsche Landesbank		No	Germany	6 Shenton Way	No
Northern Trust Company, The		Yes	United States	1 George Street	No
Rabobank		Yes	the Netherlands	77 Robinson Road	No
Royal Bank of Scotland PLC, The		Yes	United Kingdom	50 Raffles Place	No
Sanpaolo IMI S.P.A.		No	Italy	6 Temasek Boulevard	Sec
Société Générale		Yes	France	80 Robinson Road	Sec
State Street Bank and Trust Company		No	United States	168 Robinson Road	No
UBS AG	瑞士銀行	Yes	Switzerland	5 Temasek Boulevard	Sec
UFJ Bank Limited	株式会社UFJ銀行	Yes	Japan	6 Raffles Quay	No
WestLB Aktiengesellschaft		No	Germany	3 Temasek Avenue	Sec

==== Offshore banks ====
Offshore banks primarily serve non-SGD international transactions.

Below is a list of offshore banks listed in MAS Financial Institutions Directory registry that are providing services in Singapore.

Bank (English)	Local name	EFA	Incorporated in	Local address	ACU	SGS
Absa Group		No	South Africa	9 Temasek Boulevard	Yes	No
Agricultural Bank of China	中国农业银行	No	People's Republic of China	80 Raffles Place	Yes	No
Arab Bank	البنك العربي	No	Jordan	80 Raffles Place	Yes	No
Bank of Communications	交通银行	No	People's Republic of China	128 Beach Road	Yes	No
Bank of Taiwan	臺灣銀行	No	Taiwan	80 Raffles Place	Yes	No
BNY Mellon		No	United States	1 Temasek Avenue	Yes	No
Canadian Imperial Bank of Commerce		Yes	Canada	16 Collyer Quay	Yes	No
Chang Hwa Commercial Bank	彰化銀行	No	Taiwan	1 Finlayson Green	Yes	No
China Construction Bank	中国建设银行	No	People's Republic of China	9 Raffles Place	Yes	No
CIMB Bank		No	Malaysia	7 Temasek Boulevard	Yes	No
Commonwealth Bank		Yes	Australia	3 Temasek Avenue	Yes	No
Crédit Agricole		Yes	France	168 Robinson Road	Yes	No
Crédit Industriel et Commercial		Yes	France	12 Marina Boulevard	Yes	No
DNB ASA		No	Norway	8 Shenton Way	Yes	No
DZ Bank		No	Germany	50 Raffles Place	Yes	No
Hana Bank	하나은행	No	South Korea	8 Cross Street	Yes	No
Hang Seng Bank	恒生銀行有限公司	No	Hong Kong SAR	21 Collyer Quay	Yes	No
Hua Nan Commercial Bank	華南銀行	No	Taiwan	80 Robinson Road	Yes	No
Korea Development Bank	한국산업은행	No	South Korea	8 Shenton Way	Yes	No
Krung Thai Bank	ธนาคารกรุงไทย	No	Thailand	65 Chulia Street	Yes	No
Land Bank of Taiwan	土地銀行	No	Taiwan	80 Raffles Place	Yes	No
Lloyds Bank		Yes	United Kingdom	1 Temasek Avenue	Yes	No
Mitsubishi UFJ Trust and Banking Corporation	三菱信託銀行	Yes	Japan	50 Raffles Place	Yes	No
Natixis		No	France	50 Raffles Place	Yes	No
Nordea Bank		Yes	Finland	3 Anson Road	Yes	No
Norinchukin Bank	農林中央金庫	No	Japan	80 Raffles Place	Yes	No
Philippine National Bank		No	Philippines	304 Orchard Road	Yes	No
Bank Mandiri		No	Indonesia	3 Anson Road	Yes	No
Raiffeisen Bank International		No	Austria	One Raffles Quay	Yes	No
Royal Bank of Canada		Yes	Canada	20 Raffles Place	Yes	Yes
Shinhan Bank	한은행	No	South Korea	50 Raffles Place	Yes	No
Siam Commercial Bank	ธนาคารไทยพาณิชย์	No	Thailand	16 Collyer Quay	Yes	No
Skandinaviska Enskilda Banken		Yes	Sweden	50 Raffles Place	Yes	No
State Bank of India		No	India	135 Cecil Street	Yes	No
Sumitomo Mitsui Trust Holdings	住友信託銀行	Yes	Japan	8 Shenton Way	Yes	No
Svenska Handelsbanken		No	Sweden	65 Chulia Street	Yes	No
Toronto-Dominion Bank		Yes	Canada	1 Temasek Avenue	Yes	No
Union de Banques Arabes et Françaises		No	France	6 Temasek Boulevard	Yes	No
Westpac		Yes	Australia	77 Robinson Road	Yes	No
Woori Bank	우리은행	No	South Korea	5 Shenton Way	Yes	No

=== Retail banks in Singapore by total assets (as of 2024) ===
This list includes only banks that provide retail banking services in Singapore through independent corporate entities. It excludes branches of overseas banks (e.g., BOC Singapore Branch) and considers only the assets held within the Singapore entity (may includes any overseas branches operated by that entity). Assets held by overseas subsidiaries or independent entities (e.g., DBS Hong Kong) are not included.

Rank	Bank	Bank Type	Total assets (S$m)
1	DBS Singapore (Note: Includes POSB Bank.)	Local bank	543,845
2	OCBC Singapore (Note: Includes Bank of Singapore.)	Local bank	362,744
2	Bank of Singapore (Note: Part of OCBC Bank.)	Local bank (private banking subsidiary)	US$40,675m
3	UOB Singapore	Local bank	318,152
4	Standard Chartered Singapore	Foreign bank	182,245
5	Citibank Singapore	Foreign bank	53,310
6	Maybank Singapore	Foreign bank	44,227
7	HSBC Singapore	Foreign bank	34,301
8	Trust Bank	Digital bank	4,135
9	MariBank	Digital bank	2,329
10	GXS Bank	Digital bank	2,318

== Merchant banks ==
Merchant banks in Singapore are financial institutions licensed by the Monetary Authority of Singapore (MAS) to engage primarily in wholesale and investment banking activities, including corporate finance, underwriting of equity and debt securities, mergers and acquisitions advisory, portfolio management, and other fee-based financial services.

Under MAS regulations, merchant banks are not permitted to accept sight deposits or savings deposits from the public or engage in retail deposit-taking activities. However, they may raise funds from wholesale sources, including banks, finance companies, shareholders, and related corporate entities.

Merchant banks operate under a regulatory framework designed to separate wholesale investment banking activities from retail commercial banking, thereby ensuring financial stability while supporting capital market development in Singapore.

== Representative offices of banks ==
- Citibank International Personal Bank Singapore

== See also ==
- List of financial supervisory authorities by country
- Banking in Singapore
- Monetary Authority of Singapore
- Economy of Singapore
