= Singapore bank =

Singapore bank may refer to:

- Bank of Singapore, subsidiary of OCBC Bank
- Monetary Authority of Singapore, central bank of Singapore
- Banking in Singapore
  - List of banks in Singapore
