= Unmanned aircraft in Singapore =

According to the Civil Aviation Authority of Singapore (CAAS), an unmanned aircraft (UA), commonly known as a drone, is operated without a pilot on board. An unmanned aircraft system (UAS) comprises the UA and associated elements such as the remote control equipment.

Due to Singapore's busy airspace and densely populated urban environment, the UA laws in Singapore are regressive. UAs must be operated safely and responsibly to avoid risks to aviation and public safety. The CAAS requires operators to understand and abide by regulations, including recreational or research uses of the UA. More information on the regulations can be found on Air Navigation Order, paragraph 80.

== Regulation ==
=== Unmanned Aircraft (Public Safety and Security) Act ===
The Unmanned Aircraft (Public Safety and Security) Act provides clear guidelines for the safe use of unmanned aircraft.

Laws were passed in Parliament on 11 May 2015 to allay concerns over safety, security and privacy surrounding unmanned aerial vehicles (UAVs), taking effect on 1 June the same year. The Unmanned Aircraft (Public Safety and Security) Act outlines regulations for the safe flying of drones and enforcement action against errant users. For instance, permits are required to fly drones above 7 kg, or within a 5 km radius of an aerodrome.

Before conducting any outdoor activities, operators should ensure that the UA is flown within the permitted areas. The CAAS website provides a map delineating prohibited areas, danger and restricted areas, areas within 5 km of an airport or an airbase and protected areas.

=== Public Order Act ===
In 2017, the Singapore National Day Parade was gazetted as a "special event" under the Public Order Act. The order, which was in effect for 24 hours on 9 August 2017, prohibited the unauthorised flying of unmanned aerial vehicles (AUV) such as drones in the area without a permit. The boundaries of the special event area included Marina Boulevard, Victoria Street, Middle Road, Beach Road and the Marina Barrage carpark.

It is also an offence to fly a UAV outside of the special event area in a manner that "disrupts, interferes with, delays or obstructs" with the National Day Parade. Offenders may be arrested and upon conviction, be liable to an imprisonment term for up to 12 months, a fine of up to $20,000, or to both. The UAV will be seized.

The 32nd Asean summit held at the Istana on 27 April 2018 and the Shangri-La Hotel on 28 April was declared an enhanced security special event under the Public Order Act by the Ministry of Home Affairs. It is an offence to bring or fly drones in the area or outside of the area that disrupts, interferes with, delays or obstructs the conduct of the event.

=== Personal Data Protection Act ===
The Data Protection Provisions do not impose any obligation on an individual acting in his personal or domestic capacity. Organisations will need to consider whether the drones they deploy are likely to capture personal data of individuals, and may wish to evaluate whether any exception under the Personal Data Protection Act (PDPA) applies in respect of its particular circumstances.

Organisations using UAs for photography, video or audio recording activities that capture personal data should refer to the Personal Data Protection Commission's (PDPC) advisory guidelines. Among other obligations, the Data Protection Provisions require organisations to inform individuals of the purposes for which their personal data will be collected, used and disclosed in order to obtain their consent. An organisation must therefore provide notification of the purposes for the collection, use or disclosure of personal data captured by its drones, in order to fulfil the obligation to obtain consent. The notifications should specify if photography, video and/or audio recording is occurring and should generally be placed so as to enable individuals to have sufficient awareness that drones are in operation in the general locale. For example, it may be appropriate to place a notice at points of entry to the area of operation, where individuals are able to read the notice prior to entry.

=== Telecommunications Act ===
Users with UAs that contain short range devices that conform to the approved operating radio frequencies and corresponding power limits will be exempted from Info-communications Media Development Authority's (IMDA) licensing requirements. For UAs with radio frequencies or power limits that are not in the IMDA's guidelines, equipment dealers have to apply for the relevant license and register their equipment with the IMDA. Under the Telecommunications (Dealers) Regulations, an equipment dealer may only sell IMDA-registered telecommunication equipment for use in Singapore.

== Types of use ==
In general, permits are not required for recreational or research uses of UA in Singapore, as long as the operation of the UA is in line with CAAS’ operating conditions.

Situations where recreational or research uses of UA require a permit is where:

- The total mass of UA including payload exceeds 7 kg (Operator permit and Class 1 Activity Permit required)
- UA is flown higher than 200 feet above mean sea level (Class 2 Activity Permit required)
- Within restricted, danger, protected, prohibited areas and within 5 km of an aerodrome / airbase (Class 2 Activity Permit required)

=== Recreational use ===
CAAS defines recreational activities as “any pursuit or activity engaged in for enjoyment, relaxation or leisure”.

Activities that are not considered recreational uses include:

- A sporting activity that forms part of an organised group activity or organised competition or tournament (such as a flying display);
- A recreational activity provided by a business, or in the course of business.

=== Research use ===
According to CAAS, any activity falling within the following categories are considered research in nature:

- Any lecture, tutorial, seminar, demonstration, class or similar activity on unmanned aircraft provided by an educational institution, referred to in section 72 of the Private Education Act; or
- Any research and development activity carried on by an educational institution, referred to in section 72 of the Private Education Act, with the object of acquiring knowledge that may be of use for the purpose of devising or developing a new or substantially improved product that is an unmanned aircraft.

=== Other uses ===
Regardless of UA weight or location of UA operations, an operator permit and Class 1 Activity Permit is required for operations that are non-recreational or non-research in nature.

Examples of applicable uses include:

- Business providing aerial surveying or photography services
- Company's public communications department using an UA to take event photographs for its own internal newsletter
- Competitive UA races by a private organiser
- Training courses with a practical element, that is, a UA is deployed as part of the course syllabus

== Permits ==
=== Operator permit ===
CAAS grants an operator permit to an applicant who is able to ensure safe operation of UA, taking into account the applicant's organisational set-up, competency of the personnel especially those flying the UA, procedures to manage safety including the conduct of safety risk assessments, and the airworthiness of each of the aircraft. The permit is valid for up to one year.

=== Activity permit ===
An activity permit is granted by CAAS to an applicant for a single activity or a block of repeated activities to be carried out by a UA at a specific area of operation, and which are of specific operational profiles and conditions.

A Class 1 Activity permit is required for purposes that are not recreational or research in nature; or if the UA used is over 7 kg in total mass (including payload). A Class 1 Activity Permit is not valid without a UA Operator Permit.

A Class 2 Activity permit is required for UA activities for recreational or research purposes, and which meets any of these conditions:

- Operating altitude higher than 200 ft (approx. 60m) above mean sea level (AMSL);
- Within 5 km of a civil/military aerodrome; or
- Within any Restricted Area, Danger Area or Protected Area

The table below summarises the various permit fees:

Permit		Fees
Operator Permit (Valid for up to 1 year)	1st UA type	$600
Operator Permit (Valid for up to 1 year)	2nd UA and onwards [of different model and type from the 1st UA]	$400
Activity Permit	Class 1 (Class 1 activities require a valid Operator Permit before application)	$75 for each activity
Activity Permit	Class 2	$60 for each activity

=== Other permits ===
Besides permits from the CAAS, other permits may be required from various agencies depending on the nature of the usage. This includes:

- Singapore Police Force (SPF) for aerial photography and/or overflight of security-sensitive locations
- Info-communications Media Development Authority of Singapore (IMDA) for use of radio frequencies and power limits that do not follow those in IMDA's guidelines for short range devices.

== Issues ==
=== Accidents ===
Before the Act was introduced in 2015, then Transport Minister Lui Tuck Yew said in Parliament that there had been more than 20 reported incidents involving drones between April 2014 and May 2015, two of which involved the drones falling onto MRT tracks.

In 2016, the Singapore government received a report of a remote control aeroplane that damaged the roof of a housing block in Bishan. However, the operator had yet to be located, according to Transport Minister Khaw Boon Wan in a written parliamentary response.

=== Breaches of regulations ===
In 2015, a 27-year-old man who flew a drone at the War Memorial Park on National Day was given a stern warning by the police. He was believed to have been trying to take photographs of the NDP fireworks.

Between June 2015 and May 2017, the CAAS recorded 103 violations. Mr Tan Kah Han, senior director for safety regulation and director for airworthiness and flight operations at the CAAS, said that such incidents typically involve flying within 5 km of aerodromes, which is not allowed, and flying within restricted and security-sensitive areas without a permit.

In 2017, there were 12 breaches involving UAs during the National Education and preview shows according to a police statement.

On 9 August 2017, a 53-year-old man was arrested on National Day for flying a drone at Marina Barrage, which was marked within the Special Events Area. Unauthorised flying of unmanned aerial vehicles is not allowed for 24 hours on National Day.

=== Industry opinion ===
Experts highlight the risks of increasingly sophisticated drone technology being "accessible to the man on the street at brick-and-mortar shops or online", such as high-definition video capabilities making it easier for surveillance to be carried out covertly.

In 2015, The Workers' Party’s Gerald Giam, a Non-Constituency Member of Parliament, proposed fitting drones above a certain weight and size with geo-fencing capabilities, to prevent them from entering prohibited spaces. Government Parliamentary Committee (Home Affairs and Law) member Desmond Choo felt that it was important to conduct education campaigns to educate both users and companies that bring in drones.

Dr Foong Shaohui, a Singapore University of Technology and Design assistant professor with an interest in robotics and unmanned systems wrote "without proper training, even a drone weighing just 1kg can cause property damage and serious injuries".

Mr Mohamed Faisal Mohamed Salleh, deputy director of Nanyang Technology University's Air Traffic Management Research Institute, said that it can be "almost impossible" to find the pilot after UA-related accidents. To counter this issue, he suggested the use of aircraft surveillance technology to trace the positions of all UAs, which could potentially involve the use of telco or wireless networks, or by creating an "Electronic Road Pricing system in the sky".

While Yue Keng Mun, from Temasek Polytechnic's School of Engineering, proposed having indoor or fenced-up outdoor spaces for operators to practice their flying skills, Khaw responded in his parliamentary reply that "promoting shared used of space in land-scarce Singapore was preferable to setting aside special flying parks".

According to a 2018 article in The Straits Times, more private condominiums are banning the use of drones within their estates, citing concerns over privacy and safety.

== Developments in regulations and initiatives ==
In 2017, Singapore joined the Unmanned Aircraft Systems Advisory Group, a 15-member group set up by the United Nations' civil aviation arm to draw up global rules and regulations for the safe use of UAs.

In 2018, one-north was designated as Singapore's first drone estate, to provide companies and research institutions with an urban environment for test-bedding innovative unmanned aircraft systems. Under the drone estate initiative, approved operators and research users can carry out their trials and operations at one-north without compromising safety and security.

The Singapore Armed Forces have invested in new technologies such as drones that can home in and catch errant drones. Counter-drone systems are among the features of airbases of the future.

== See also ==
- Aerial photography § Regulations
- Regulation of unmanned aerial vehicles § By country
