= Maxspid =

Maxspid Enterprise Pte Ltd is a Singaporean company that produces emergency lighting. It was founded in 1978.

== History ==
Jimi Wong graduated from Singapore Polytechnic with a Diploma in Electrical Engineering. According to Asiaweek, Wong started out in the lighting industry as an employee but as the lighting industry became saturated and the emergency lighting industry grew to be a “potentially lucrative market”, Wong eventually ventured out on his own. Maxspid was founded by Wong as a sole proprietorship in 1978. The business became more lucrative in 1982, when it became compulsory for all local commercial and industrial buildings to install emergency lighting.

Wong's eldest son, James Wong, eventually joined the company and is now a general manager in Maxspid.

Maxspid was the first local company to manufacture emergency lighting, and now manufactures products varying from emergency exit luminaires to emergency kits and peripherals.

In 1986, Maxspid participated in the sixth biennial electrical and electronic technology exhibition at the World Trade Centre in Singapore. With the support of Singapore Trade Development Board, the company also participated in other overseas exhibitions such as the Hanover Fair in Western Germany and the fifth International Building Exhibition in 1987 held at Hong Kong.

Along with five other companies in the lighting industry, Maxspid formed the Singapore Lighting Consortium so as to secure more construction projects. In a The Straits Times article, Wong said that “such alliances enable small and medium enterprises to get a piece of the action without too huge a capital outlay.” This partnership ensures that they can continue to expand and endure in the industry. Wong sits on the management board of the Singapore Lighting Association.

== Products and services ==
Maxspid's produces emergency exit lights, emergency power packs and emergency luminaire. The exit signage luminaries use different types of lamps such as cold cathode fluorescent lamp, light-emitting diode (LED) lamp and fluorescent lamp. They also maintain lighting for some customers.

The company has attained the ISO 9000 certification for its products. Maxspid products also comply with Singapore compulsory standards.

The external design of the exit sign has largely remained the same, featuring a green sign with white letters spelling the letters 'Exit'. There is little room for customization of design when producing these signs as it is strictly regulated by the Singapore Civil Defence Force (SCDF). SCDF set these fire safety standards to ensure that all emergency signs used in Singapore will remain consistent. Despite such constraints, Marxspid has made some improvements in areas such as efficiency.

== Operations ==
The standards required for emergency signs means that differentiating factors between Maxspid's products are minimal, which helps them keep their inventory costs low. To reduce production costs, Mr Jimi Wong moved their manufacturing plant to Petaling Jaya in Malaysia in the 1980s, and again to China in the mid-1990s. Maxspid's Singapore headquarters focuses on research and development and also serves as a distribution point. The company also relies on outsourcing some components to other companies to minimise costs.

Maxspid has worked on local projects. Featured projects include the ION Orchard, Biopolis, Resorts World Sentosa, Singapore Management University and Changi Airport Terminal 3. Some of their notable customers include Changi Airport Terminals 1, 2 and 3, NTUC Income building, Marina Bay Suites, Lasalle College of the Arts, OCBC Bank, Supreme Court of Singapore, One Fullerton, Singapore General Hospital, Resorts World Sentosa, ION Orchard, National University of Singapore and Singapore Flyer.

Maxspid has also expanded overseas to countries such as Hong Kong, Indonesia, Philippines, Myanmar, Laos, Vietnam, Sri Lanka, India, Pakistan and South Africa. They hope to expand further into emerging markets such as Myanmar, Laos and the Middle East in the future.
