= Bank of China Building (Singapore) =

Office skyscraper in Singapore

- 中國銀行大廈
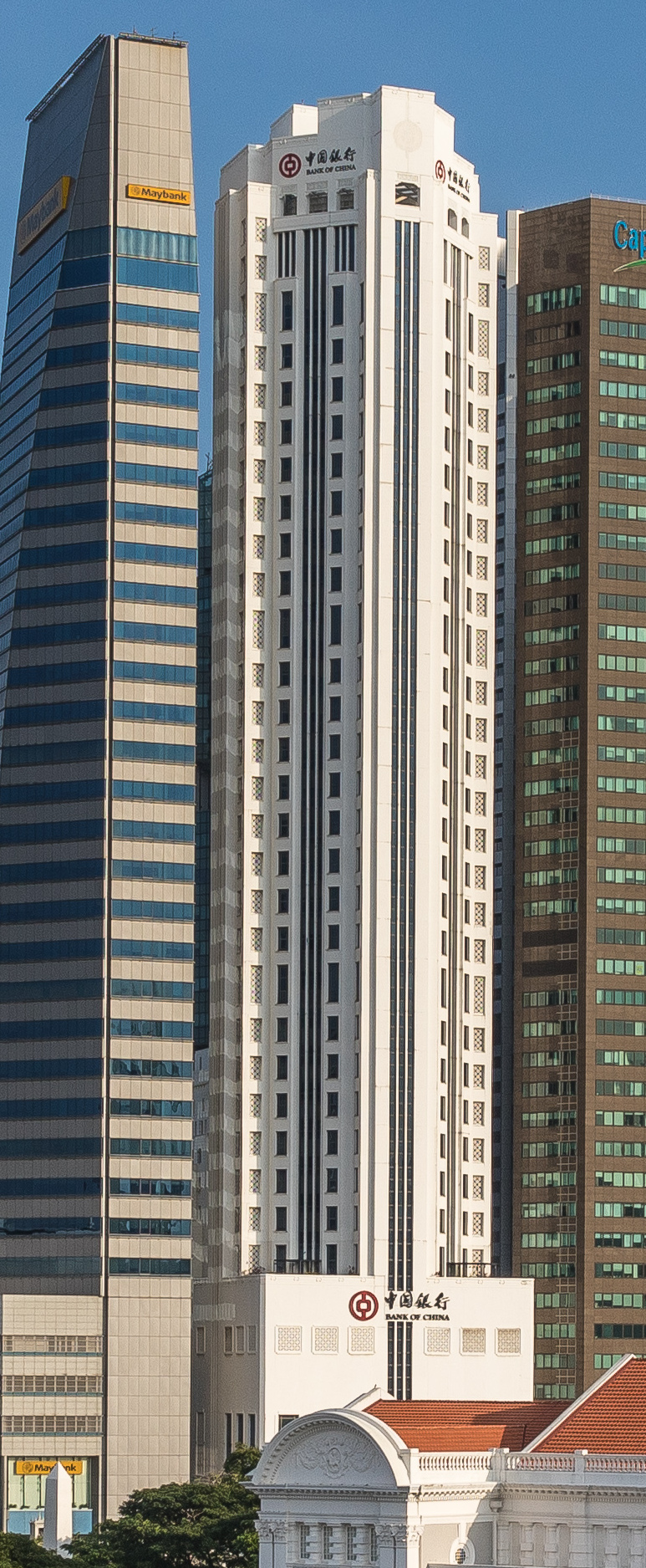
- Bank of China Building in 2018
- Interactive map of the Bank of China Building area

General information
- Status: Completed
- Type: Commercial offices
- Architectural style: Modernism
- Location: 4 Battery Road, Singapore 049908
- Coordinates: 1.285617°N 103.852177°E
- Construction started: Old: 1948; New: 1994
- Completed: Old: 1953; New: 2000
- Owner: Bank of China

Height
- Roof: Old: 200 ft (61 m); New: 168 m (551 ft)

Technical details
- Floor count: Old: 16; New: 36

Design and construction
- Architects: P & T Architects & Engineers

The Bank of China Building is a development consisting of two skyscrapers located in the central business district of Singapore. It is located on 4 Battery Road, adjacent to 6 Battery Road, Maybank Tower, and roughly 100 metres from the Fullerton Hotel. The Tower serves as the headquarters for the Bank of China.

== Design ==
The original building was designed by Palmer and Turner. The building has 16 floors and a height of 200 feet (61 m), and according to the Singapore Standard, was designed to look similar to the Bank of China's premises in Shanghai and Hong Kong.

The building's entrance is flanked by two Chinese lions sculpted from pre-cast stone. At the time of opening, the building's basement housed the bank's safe deposit boxes and a car park, while the Bank of China occupied the lowest three and top three floors of the building. The lower half of the building was air-conditioned, and the building was the first in Singapore to incorporate a mail chute and document lifts.

== History ==
=== Planning and construction ===
The Bank of China building was first conceptualised in the late 1930s by the Bank of China's Singapore branch. The branch, which was then housed in the lower two floors of the Great Eastern Life building in Cecil Street, had found that their current premises were increasingly inadequate for them, and planned to build a new building to house its operations. The branch then purchased a 21,285 square feet (1,977.4 m^{2}) land parcel along Battery Road for the new building for $715,000 in May 1937.

The Straits Times reported in November 1946 that the branch had submitted plans for the building to the Singapore Municipal Architect. The planned building was to have 14 floors and reach a height of 200 feet (61 m), and it would have been, according to The Straits Times, the tallest building in Malaya if completed. In addition, the branch had informed Gian Singh and Co., which was occupying the buildings on the site, to move out from the buildings by January 1947. Gian Singh appealed to the Rent Board for a two-month extension, but the appeal was rejected. Nevertheless, Gian Singh decided to stay in their current premises past the deadline, until they were able to move all their inventory to their new location, which was only completed in March 1947.

With the previous tenants having moved out, and the plans for the new building approved by the Municipal Commissioners, work on the building began, and demolition of the existing buildings on the site was underway by May 1947. Construction of the building's foundations commenced in November 1948. Initially expected to be completed by March 1949, work on the foundations fell behind schedule, as it had to be done carefully to ensure that the foundations of nearby buildings were not damaged. The foundations were eventually completed in February 1950.

Upon the completion of the building's foundation, the branch sought approval for the construction of the superstructure from Bank of China headquarters in Peking, which they obtained in May 1950. Tenders for the construction and fitting out of the building's superstructure were called in March 1951, and construction of the superstructure commenced in April 1951. The building was completed by December 1953, and the Bank of China commenced operations from the building in the same month.

=== Expansion ===
In the late 1980s, as part of plans to expand its presence in Singapore, the Bank of China drew up plans to partially redevelop the Bank of China building. The building was to be redeveloped into a 34-floor tower, and the redevelopment plans were disclosed to the public in December 1990. Portions of the old building that were to be torn down to make way for the tower had been closed off by August 1992, and the bank started pre-qualification of contractors for the redevelopment in the same month. The groundbreaking ceremony for the building's redevelopment was held on 15 April 1994.

The additional new block was completed in 2000. With 36 floors and a height of 168 metres it is built immediately adjacent to the old block and shares a common podium.

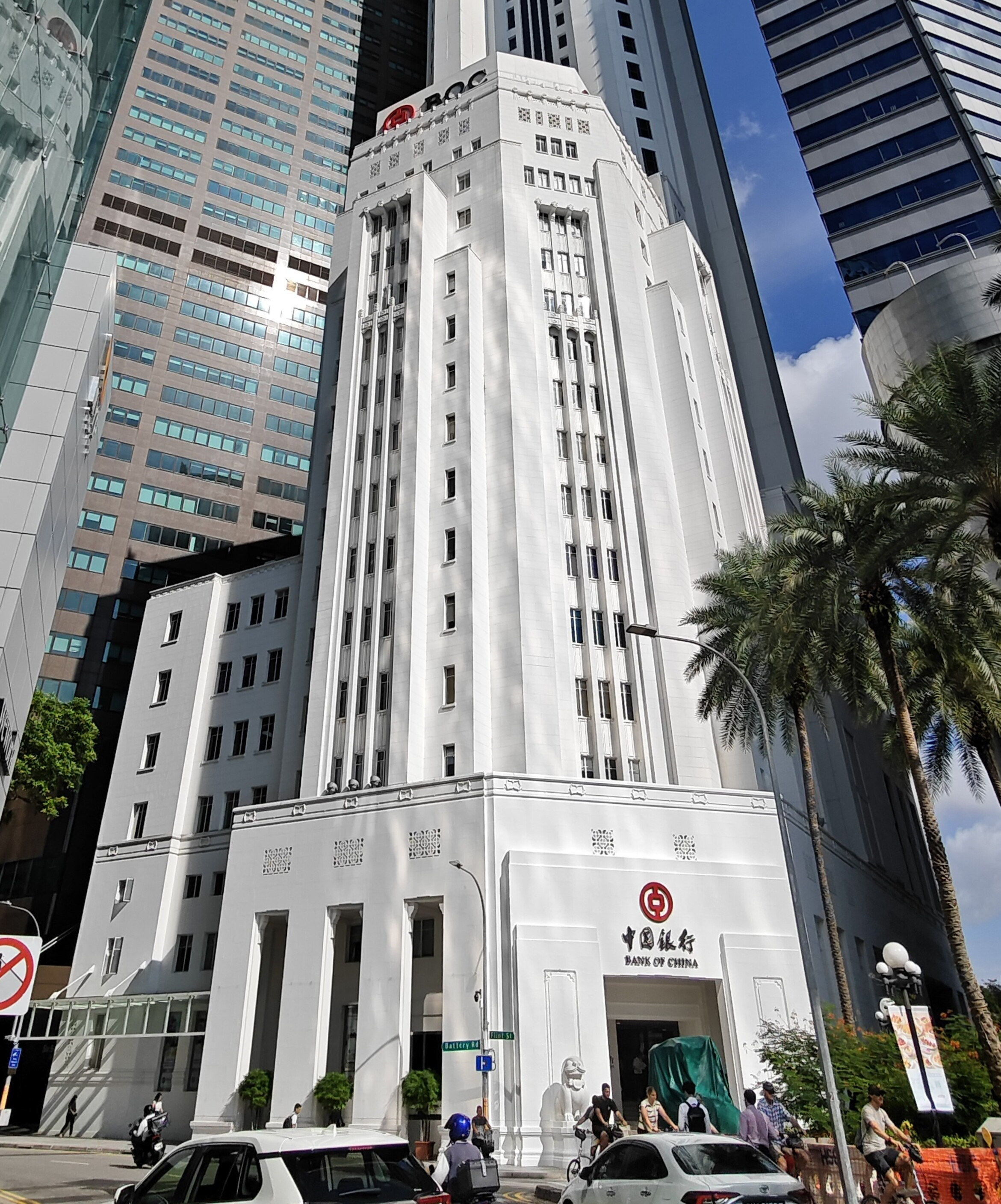
The original building

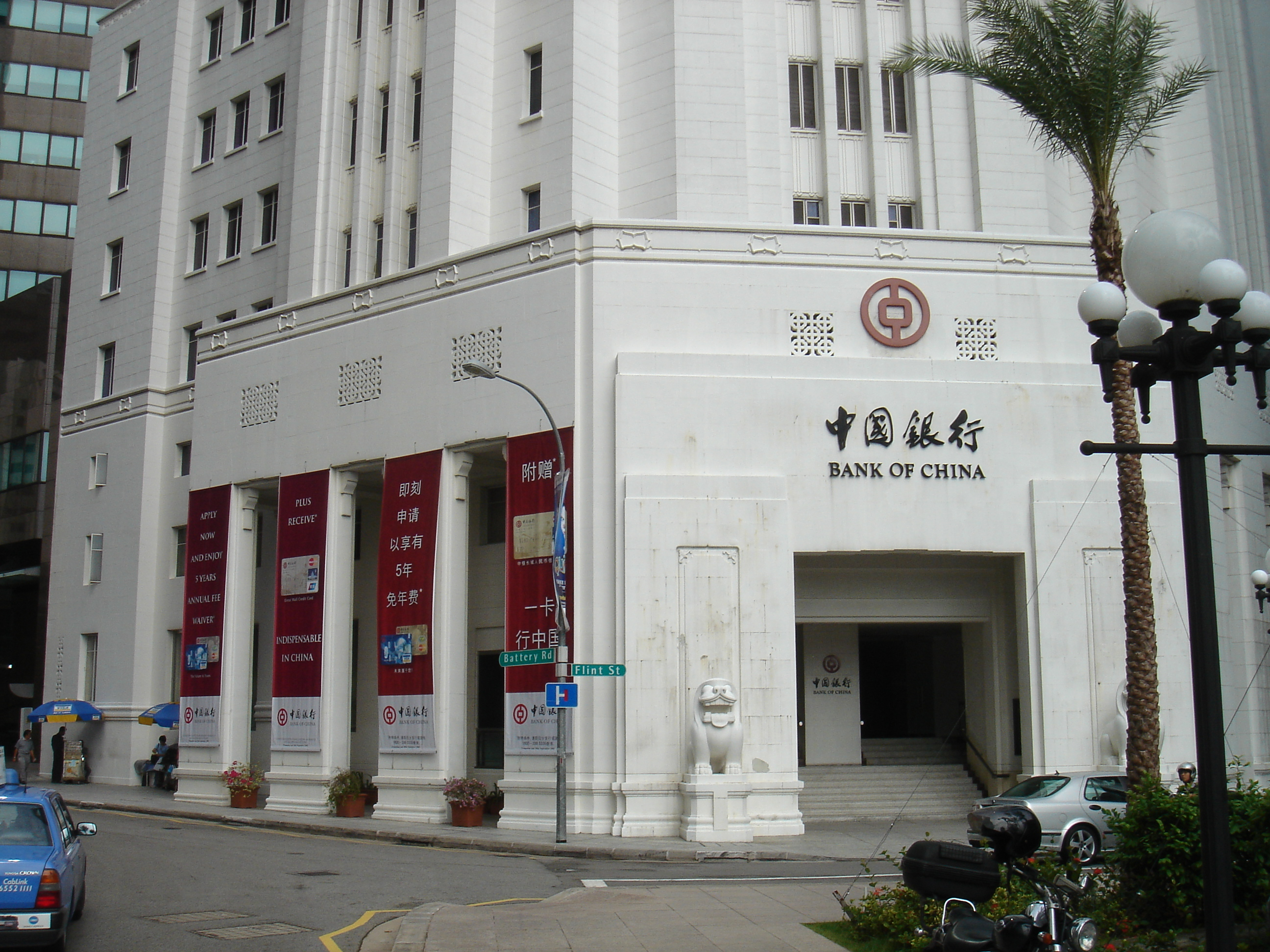
Entrance guarded by Nolli's lions

== See also ==
- List of tallest buildings in Singapore
- List of banks in Singapore
- Bank of China
