= Atm⁵ =

atm⁵
- Operating area: Singapore
- Members: 6
- ATMs: 230+
- Founded: 2005

atm⁵ is an interbank network in Singapore, connecting the ATMs of six of Singapore's eight qualifying full banks, QFB. As of 2016, there are 230+ atm⁵ ATMs island-wide.

The network was established in April 2005 when ABN Amro and Citibank joined the already-existing shared ATM network of HSBC, Standard Chartered, and Maybank.

atm⁵ is also one of the few interbank networks that does not charge its customers for transactions via another member bank's ATM, having removed all interbank transaction charges on 4 April 2006.

One of the six atm5 members, Citibank has numerous ATMs, but only a small percentage of them can be used for atm⁵ transactions. Hence, banks usually recommend customers to make sure that the atm⁵ logo is present on the members' ATM before they carry out their transaction(s).

== Members ==
atm⁵ is the primary network of the following banks listed below:

Bank	Number of participating ATMs	Minimum withdrawal per transaction
Citibank Singapore	25	$100
Maybank	25	$10
HSBC	23	$10
State Bank of India	25	$10
Standard Chartered Singapore	20	$10
Bank of China	20	$10

Former atm5 members include the ABN AMRO Bank N.V., Royal Bank of Scotland and the Australia and New Zealand Banking Group. All three banks are no longer part of the atm5 network, as ABN Amro sold its personal banking business to RBS, before being sold to ANZ in 2010, and then to DBS in 2018.

== See also ==
- List of banks in Singapore
- ATM usage fees
