= Trust Bank (Singapore) =

Bank in Singapore

- Native name: 优信銀行
- Company type: Private Limited
- Industry: Bank, Financial services
- Founded: 2022; 4 years ago, incorporated in Singapore
- Headquarters: 77 Robinson Road, #25-00 Robinson 77, 068896, Singapore
- Key people: Dwaipayan Sadhu (CEO)
- Products: Credit cards; Retail banking; Corporate banking; Mortgage loans; Wealth management
- Revenue: ▲SGD$39.1 million (US$29.18 million) (2023)
- Net income: SGD$128 million (US$95.52 million)(2023) (at a profit)
- Total assets: ▲SGD$2.1 billion (US$1.57 billion) (2023)
- Total equity: ▲SGD$168 million (US$125.37 million) (2023)
- Website: trustbank.sg

Trust Bank is the largest digital bank in Singapore, established in 2022 through a partnership between Standard Chartered and FairPrice Group. It is operating under a Full Bank license issued by Monetary Authority of Singapore.

== History ==
On 1 September 2022, Trust bank was officially launched as a joint venture between Standard Chartered Bank (Singapore) and Fairprice Group. It offered savings account, credit card and personal accident insurance at its debut. This is part of a collective effort by Singapore's government and banking industry to further digitalise the sector and provide more convenience to customers.

Even though it is operating as a fully digital bank, Trust is operating under a full banking license secured through its parent Standard Chartered. Most other digital banks in Singapore were only issued a Digital Bank license by MAS which would not have their own ATMs or cash deposit machines. Other local digital banks are mostly similar collaborations between big tech companies, such as GXS bank by Grab and Singtel, Maribank by Sea Group.

In 2023, Trust bank had more than 500,000 customers, which is about 10 per cent of Singapore’s adult population.

In 2024, the bank had more than 800,000 customers. The deposit balance had surged from S$1.2 billion to more than S$3 billion. The CEO Sadhu predicted that the bank can become profitable by the end of 2025.

In February 2025, Trust bank became the fourth-largest retail bank in Singapore by customer number after hitting 1 million sign-ups.

== Ownership ==
Trust Bank is backed by Standard Chartered and FairPrice Group. Standard Chartered holds a 60% stake in the initial S$400 million investment, while Fairprice holds the remaining 40%.
