= Marina Bay Financial Centre =

Mixed-use development in Singapore

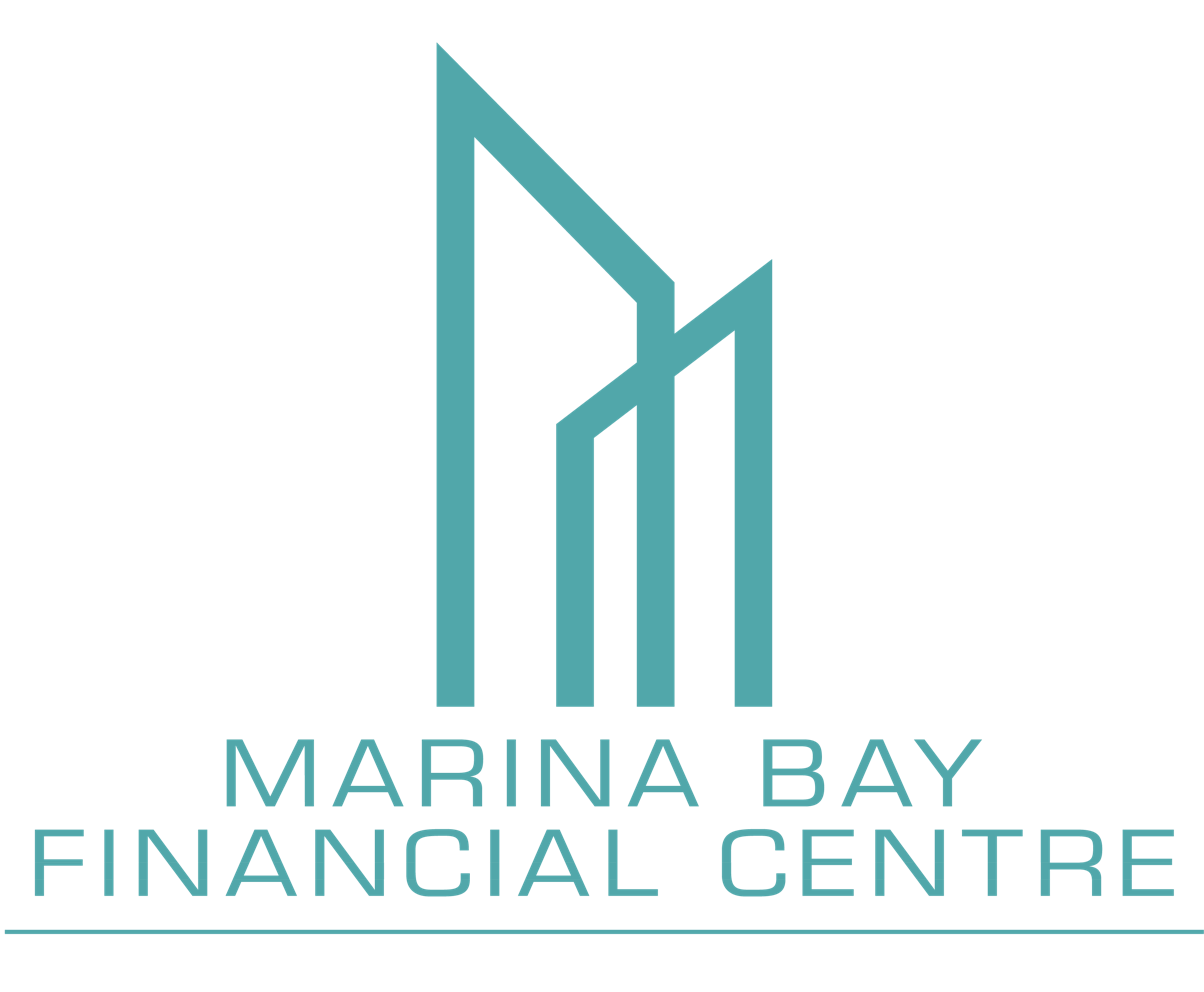
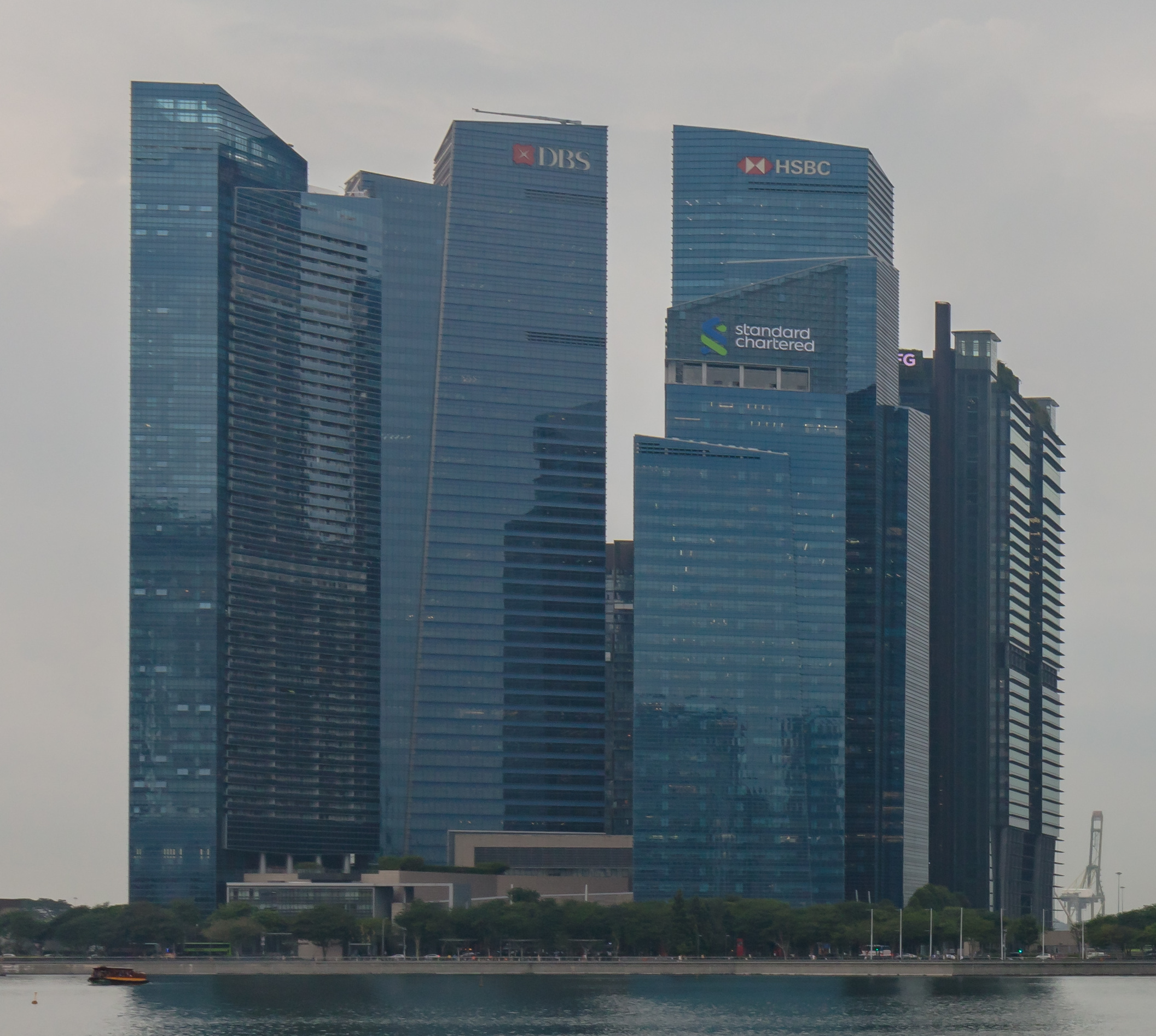
- Marina Bay Financial Centre in August 2023
- Interactive map of the Marina Bay Financial Centre area

General information
- Status: Completed
- Type: Integrated Development
- Architectural style: Office complex, retail and residential
- Location: Marina Boulevard, Downtown Core, Singapore
- Operator: Raffles Quay Asset Management

Height
- Roof: 245m, 239m, 227m, 222m, 192m

Technical details
- Floor count: 66, 55, 49, 46, 32

Design and construction
- Architects: Kohn Pedersen Fox; DCA Architects
- Developer: Hongkong Land; Cheung Kong/Hutchison Whampoa; Keppel Land

Other information
- Public transit: DT17 Downtown; NS27 CC33 TE20 Marina Bay

The Marina Bay Financial Centre (MBFC) is a mixed-use development located along Marina Boulevard and Central Boulevard within the Downtown Core of Singapore. It consists of three office towers, two residential towers and retail space at Marina Bay Link Mall, occupying a 3.55-hectare (8.8-acre) site.

The construction of the Marina Bay Financial Centre development consisted of two phases, with its first phase completed in 2010. The entire development was completed in 2012 and the grand opening of Marina Bay Financial Centre was officiated by Prime Minister Lee Hsien Loong on 15 May 2013.

The first phase includes the construction of office Tower 1, which consists of 33 storeys, office Tower 2, which consists of 50 storeys, Marina Bay Residences with 428 units and a retail mall. The architect for phase 1 was local DCA Architects. The second phase comprises office Tower 3, which consists of 46 storeys, a retail mall and Marina Bay Suites with 221 units. Marina Bay Suites attained Temporary Occupation Permit (TOP) in June 2013. For this major project, Schindler Singapore supplied a total of 105 units of elevators and 6 units of escalators.

Clyde & Co, currently located on the 30th floor of Tower 3, houses the Honorary Consulate of Iceland.

== Office towers ==
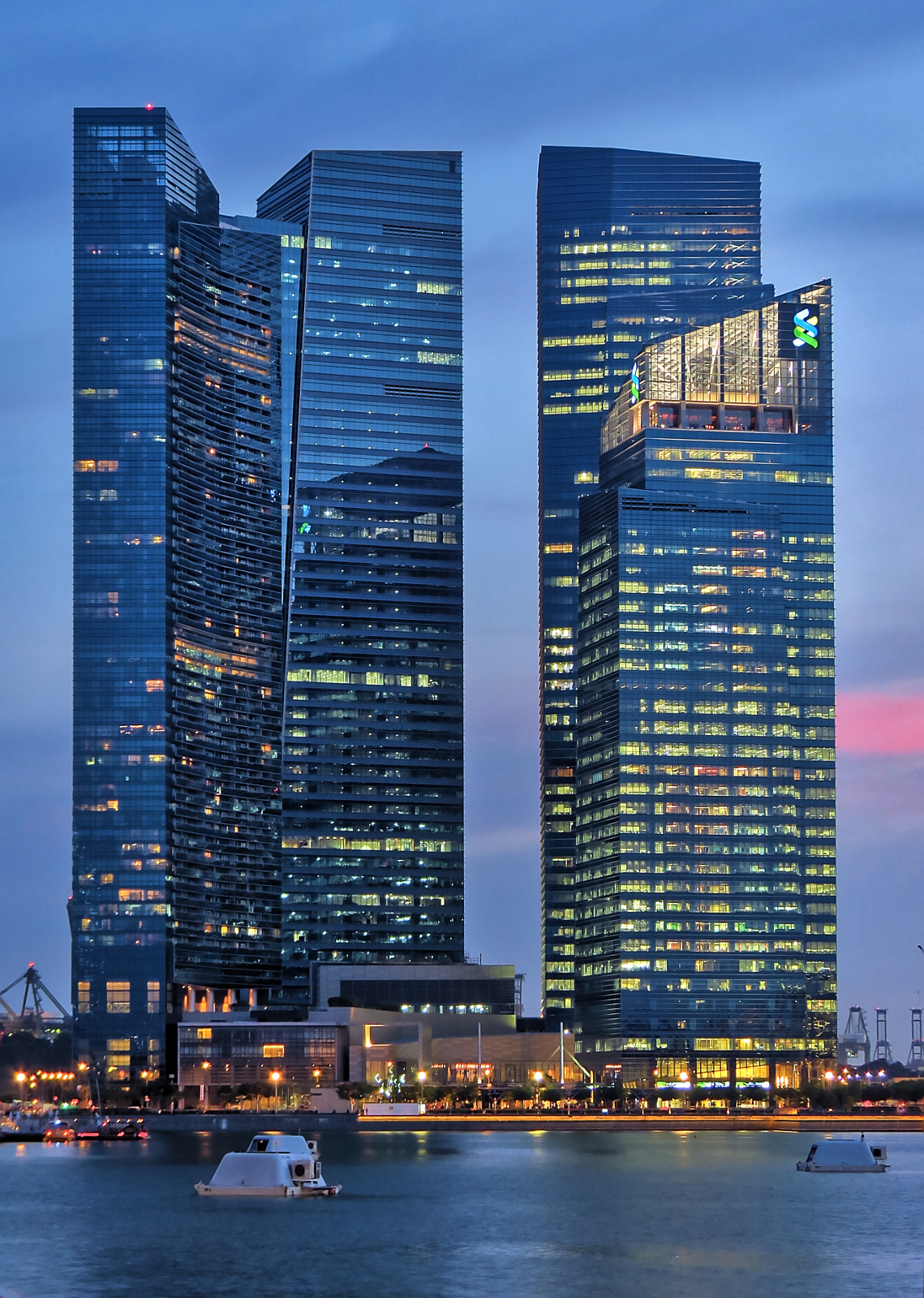
Marina Bay Financial Centre

Tower 1 is being fully leased to international banking and financial institutions such as Standard Chartered bank, the anchor tenant occupying 500,000 square feet (46,000 m^{2}) of the office space, Baker McKenzie, Raffles Quay Asset Management, Societe Generale and Wellington Management Company. The world's highest urban microbrewery, LeVeL33, is also located on the top of Tower 1.

Tower 2 is being leased to multi-national institutions such as IBM, American Express, BHP, Bank Pictet, Barclays, Eastspring Investments, Pain X Chiropractic Center, Murex, NEX, Nomura Securities and Servcorp.

The anchor tenant of Tower 3 is DBS Bank, which occupies over 600,000 square feet (56,000 m^{2}) of the office space. Other tenants are a mix of multinational companies from various sectors such as legal firms, real estate development, financial services, commodities and specialist food providers, energy trading and technology companies. They include Booking.com, Ashurst, Aryzta, Clifford Chance, Endurance Specialty Insurance, Fitness First, Evercore, Gunvor, Louis Dreyfus, Lynx Energy Trading, M&A Development, S&P Global, Mead Johnson, IWG, Software, Trammo and WongPartnership. Tower 3 attained Temporary Occupation Permit (TOP) in March 2012.

== Awards ==
Marina Bay Suites, the second luxury residential development won the FIABCI Singapore Property Awards 2014. The Singapore Property Awards is the local chapter of the international FIABCI Prix d'Excellence Awards.

Marina Bay Financial Centre (MBFC) clinched the top award in the Office category at the FIABCI Prix d'Excellence Awards 2012 (held in May), which recognises the world's outstanding real estate developments. Marina Bay Residences (MBR) was runner-up in the Residential (High Rise) category.

Marina Bay Financial Centre (MBFC) also won the Gold award for the mixed-use category in the MIPIM Asia Awards 2011 (held in November), which honours outstanding real estate projects in the Asia Pacific region. MBFC also won the Participants‟ Choice Award, which honours the project that receives the most delegate votes.

Marina Bay Residences (MBR) and Marina Bay Financial Centre (MBFC) Phase 1 were named winners in the Residential (High Rise) and Office Categories respectively at the inaugural FIABCI Singapore Property Awards held in October 2011.

Marina Bay Financial Centre (MBFC) has won accolades for its achievements towards environmental sustainability under the BCA Green Mark awards.

- 2009 — BCA Green Mark Gold Plus Award for Phase 2 (Commercial Tower 3)
- 2009 — BCA Green Mark Gold Award for Marina Bay Suites
- 2008 — BCA Green Mark Gold Award for Phase 1 (Commercial Towers 1 and 2)
- 2007 — BCA Green Mark Gold Award for Marina Bay Residences
- 2017–2020 — Workplace Safety and Health Awards

== Marina Bay Link Mall ==
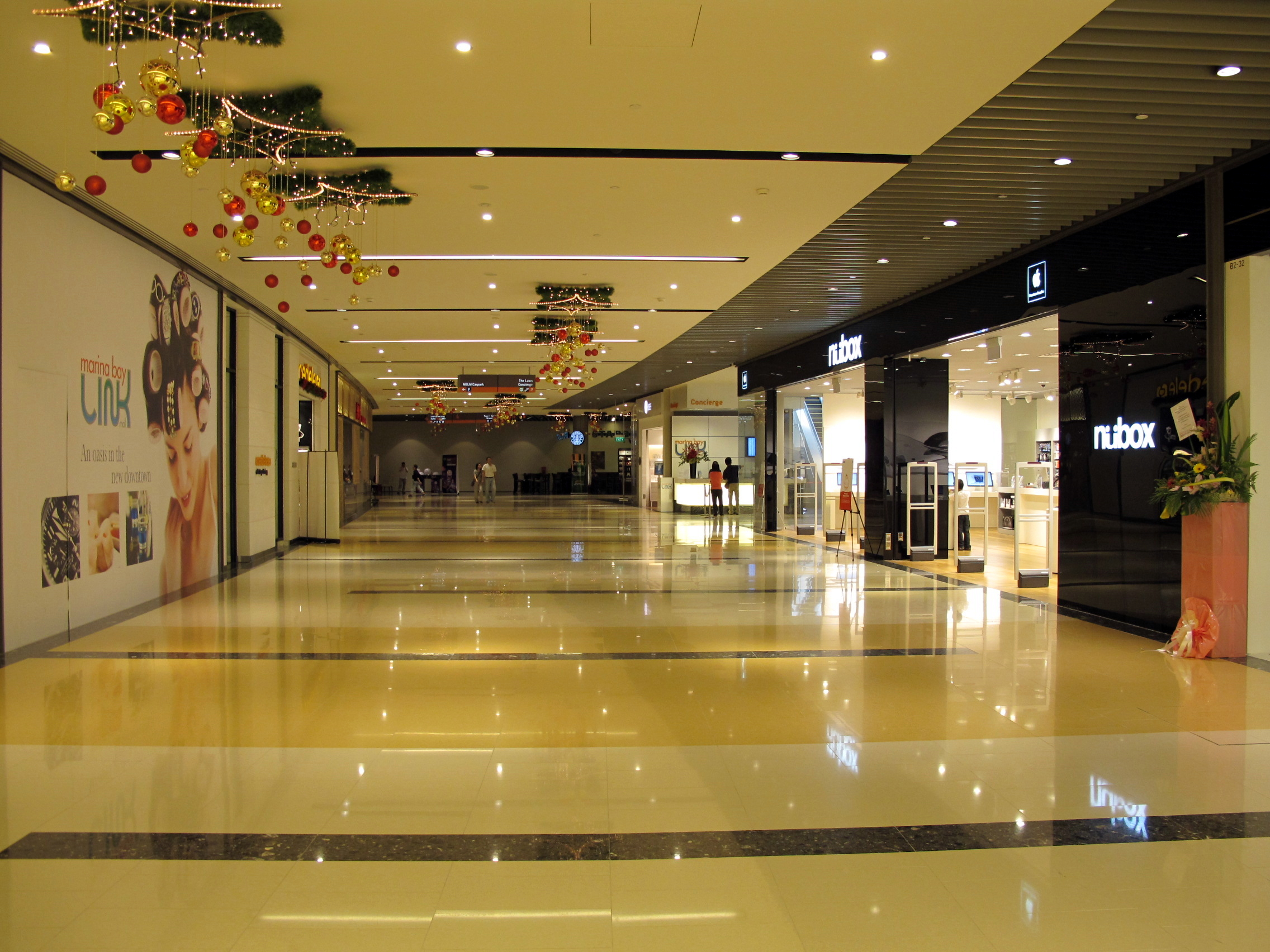
Marina Bay Link Mall

Marina Bay Link Mall (MBLM) offers about 179,000 sq ft (Phase 1 and 2 combined) of retail and dining space. Phase 1 was opened to the public on 3 November 2010. The mall is largely a subterranean mall with shops at the basement, ground level, the office towers and an alfresco dining area at the Ground Plaza located between MBFC Tower 1 and Marina Bay Residences.

== Transportation ==
- Downtown MRT station is linked to Basement 2 of Marina Bay Link Mall.
- 5 mins away from Shenton Way MRT station on the Thomson–East Coast line
- 5 mins away from Marina Bay MRT station on the North South line, Circle line and Thomson–East Coast line
- 10 mins away from Raffles Place MRT station on North South line and East West line.
