= Marina Bay Suites =

Residential skyscraper in Singapore

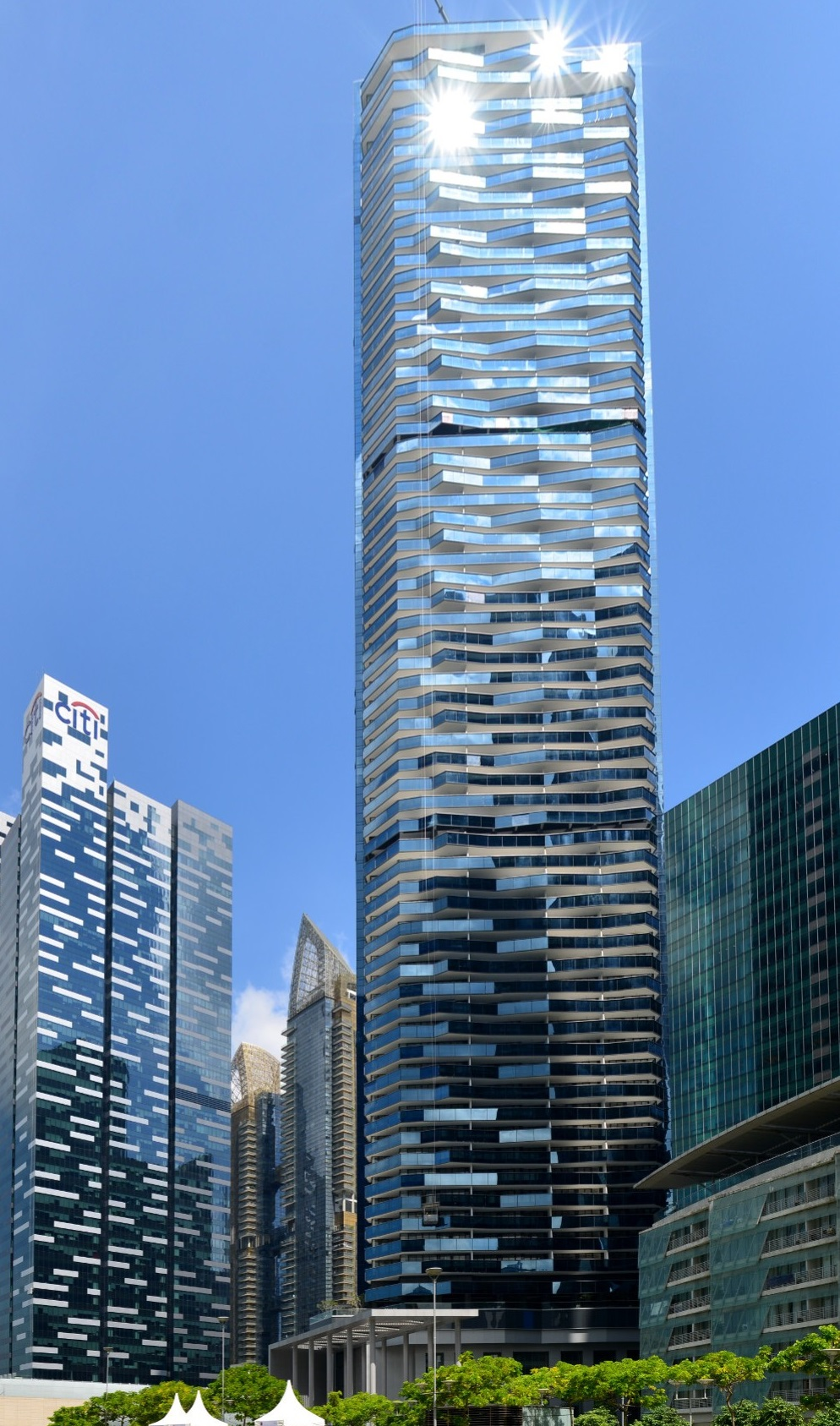
- Interactive map of the Marina Bay Suites area

General information
- Type: Condominium
- Location: 3 Central Boulevard, Singapore 018965
- Coordinates: 1°16′49″N 103°51′08″E

Height
- Height: 227 m (745 ft)

Technical details
- Floor count: 66

Design and construction
- Architect: Kohn Pedersen Fox
- Developer: Keppel Land, Cheung Kong Holdings, Hongkong Land

Other information
- Number of units: 221

Website
- www.mbfc.com.sg/suites.html

Marina Bay Suites is a condominium in Marina Bay, Singapore. It is one of six towers of the Marina Bay Financial Centre. It was developed by Keppel Land, Cheung Kong Holdings and Hongkong Land. It stands at 227 metres (745 ft), with 66 floors, making it Singapore's 14th tallest tower. It consists of 108 three-bedroom units (1,572 square feet (146.0 m^{2}) to 1,604 square feet (149.0 m^{2})), 110 four-bedroom units (2,045 square feet (190.0 m^{2}) to 2,695 square feet (250.4 m^{2})), and three penthouses (4,682 square feet (435.0 m^{2}) to 8,181 square feet (760.0 m^{2})).

== Incident ==
In the pre-dawn hours of 14 January 2014, a fire broke out on the 65th floor's service lift lobby. Two security officers died. Residents had evacuated the building and were unharmed. The area that was damaged was the zone that were under renovation.
