= Citibank International Personal Bank Singapore =

Business unit of Citibank Singapore

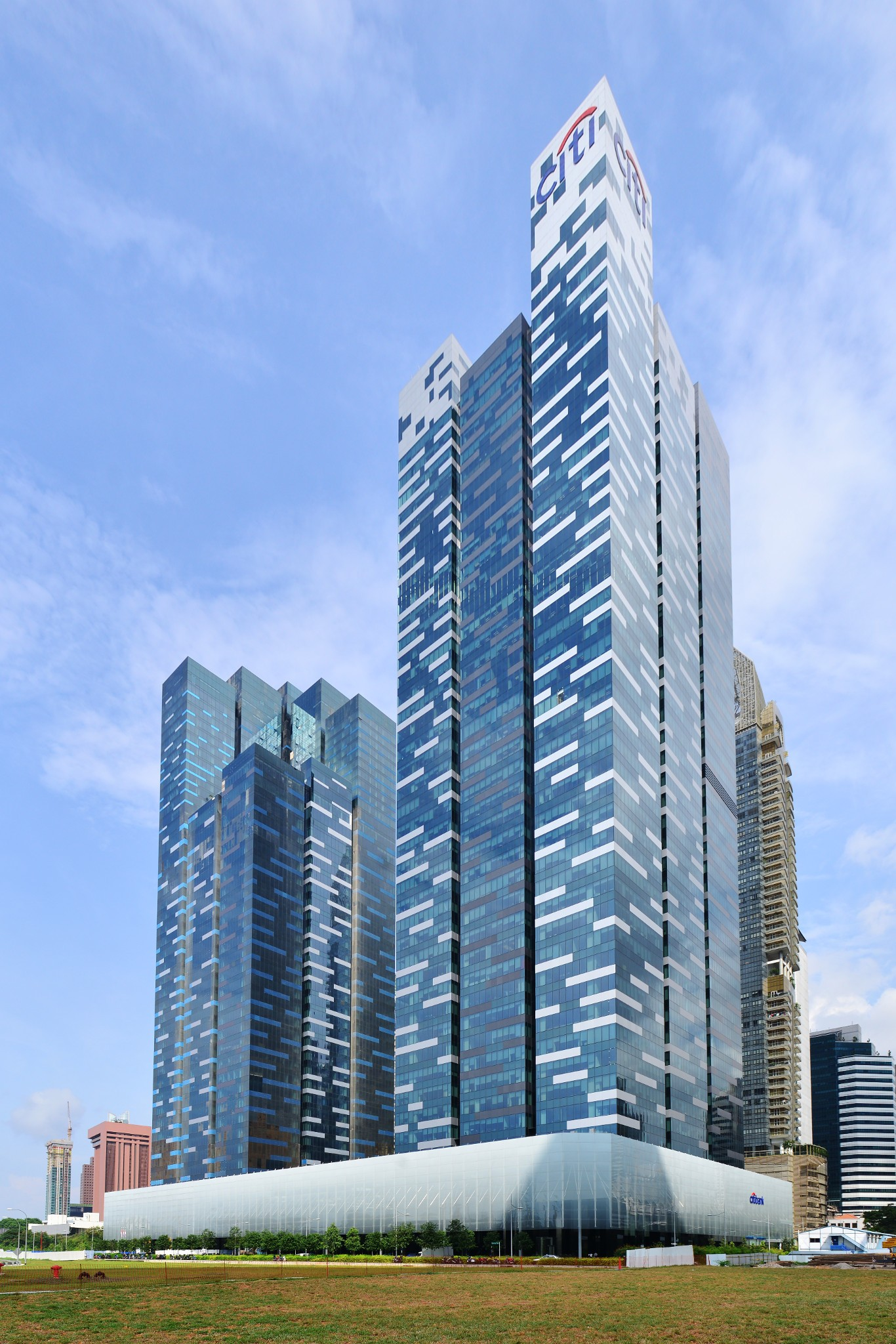
- The anchor tenant of Tower 1 of Asia Square, is Citibank Singapore
- Type: Subsidiary of Citigroup
- Industry: Financial Services, Banking
- Founded: 1983; 43 years ago
- Headquarters: 8 Marina View; Asia Square; Tower 1, #21-00; Singapore 018960, Singapore, Singapore
- Area served: Worldwide
- Key people: Shyam Sambamurthy, Global Head
- Products: Loans, Insurance, Bonds, Wealth Management
- Parent: Citibank Singapore
- Website: www.ipb.citibank.com.sg

Citibank International Personal Bank (IPB) Singapore is a business unit of Citibank Singapore that specializes in offshore investment and wealth management products and services to high-net-worth individuals residing outside of Singapore. It has 5 booking centers around the world in London, Jersey, Singapore, Hong Kong and the United States. As of 2018, IPB global had a base of about 260,000 clients and managed assets of more than US$60 billion.

== History ==
Citibank is one of the earliest financial institutions in Singapore that is still in operation today.

In 1902 International Banking Corporation becomes the first American bank to open a branch in Singapore. Located at 1 Prince Street, the Singapore branch focused on financing the exports of tin and rubber from the Malayan hinterland.

In 1983 Citi's International Personal Bank (IPB) Singapore was established to meet the offshore banking needs of affluent individuals who reside outside of Singapore.

In 1999 Citibank was among the first four foreign banks to be awarded the Qualifying Full Bank (QFB) license by the Monetary Authority of Singapore (MAS) in 1999.

In 2004 Citibank incorporated the consumer banking business locally, forming Citibank Singapore Limited (CSL), a wholly owned subsidiary of Citi, with a paid-up capital of S$1.5 billion. The QFB license was transferred to the new, locally incorporated entity.

In 2015 Citibank Singapore listed by Monetary Authority of Singapore in April 2015 as one of the Domestic Systemically Important banks (DSIBs) in Singapore.

In October 2015, Citibank appointed C R Sambamurthy as the first global head for its International Personal Bank business.

In 2016, Citibank launched Total Wealth Advisor (TWA), a goal-based planning tool that tracks and monitors the performance by the success of investments in meeting a client's personal goals.

== Products and services ==
Citibank IPB Singapore offers a range of banking and investment products and services such as deposit accounts, loans, insurance, bonds and investment funds. Their digital services include desktop and mobile banking, also known as Citibank Online and Citi Mobile respectively.

=== Wealth management ===
"Citigold" offers a premium set of wealth management services to customers with investible assets of at least US$200,000 (or equivalent). "Citigold Private Client" is intended for high-net-worth clients with investible assets above US$1 million (or equivalent). Citigold Private Client wealth management services include the provision of a dedicated senior relationship manager, financial planning and lifestyle privileges.

=== Online brokerage ===
Citibank IPB E-Brokerage provides a Do-it-yourself investing brokerage service. The fee structure is higher compared to Interactive Brokers or Charles Schwab. However, when compared to other regional banks, it is at similar levels.
