= Keppel TatLee Bank =

Former bank

- Company type: Public (1998-2001); Private (2001)
- Predecessor: Keppel Bank; Tat Lee Bank
- Founded: 26 December 1998; 27 years ago
- Defunct: 25 February 2002; 24 years ago
- Fate: Merged with Oversea-Chinese Banking Corporation
- Headquarters: Singapore
- Key people: Benedict Kwek (CEO)
- Services: Financial services
- Revenue: ▲SG$469.456 million (1999)
- Operating income: ▲SG$312.873 million (1999)
- Net income: ▼SG$186.703 million (1999)
- Total assets: ▲SG$22,406.634 million (1999)
- Parent: Keppel Capital Holdings Ltd (since 2001)

Keppel TatLee Bank (Chinese: 吉宝达利银行; pinyin: Jíbǎo Dálì Yínháng) was a Singapore-based financial services organisation formed through a merger of Keppel Bank and Tat Lee Bank on 26 December 1998. It was acquired by Oversea-Chinese Banking Corporation (OCBC) in August 2001 and was integrated into OCBC Bank in 2002.

== History ==
The bank was formed on 26 December 1998 when Keppel Bank acquired another Singapore financial institution, Tat Lee Bank. Keppel Bank was formed in 1990, when Keppel Corporation acquired the Asia Commercial Bank.

The bank formed a strategic alliance with Allied Irish Banks in 1999, which allowed AIB to take up a 24.9% stake in the bank. In 2001, the bank was privatised and became a subsidiary of Keppel Capital Holdings Ltd (KCH), as part of a restructure of KCH. Its parent company was then acquired by OCBC, operationally and legally integrated with it in 2002.
