= Standard Chartered Singapore =

Commercial bank in Singapore

Standard Chartered Bank (Singapore) Limited
- Standard Chartered Singapore logo since 2021.

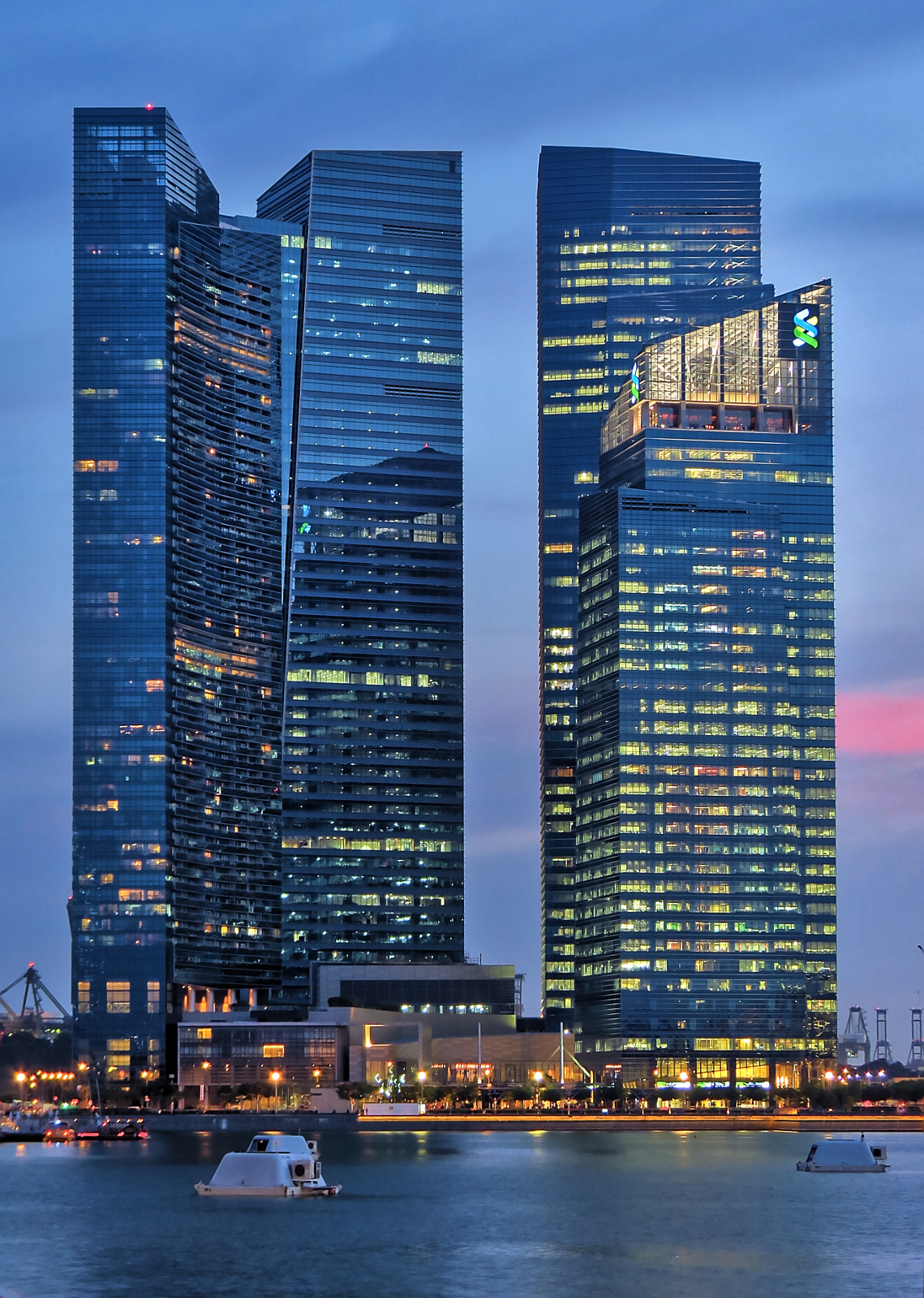
- Standard Chartered Singapore head office in Marina Bay Financial Centre, Singapore.
- Industry: Banking, Financial services
- Predecessor: Standard Chartered, Singapore Branch
- Founded: 1859; 167 years ago, Singapore, Straits Settlements
- Headquarters: Marina Bay Financial Centre, Downtown Core, Central Region, Singapore
- Area served: Singapore; Worldwide (Private banking)
- Key people: Patrick Lee (Singapore CEO)
- Services: Credit cards Consumer banking Corporate banking Investment banking Mortgage loans Private banking Wealth management
- Operating income: ▲SGD$3.86 billion (US$2.88 billion) (2023)
- Net income: ▲SGD$1.67 billion (US$1.25 billion) (2023)
- Total assets: ▲SGD$142.12 billion (US$106.06 billion) (2023)
- Total equity: ▲SGD$11.28 billion (US$8.42 billion) (2023)
- Number of employees: 9,000 (2026)
- Website: sc.com/sg/

Standard Chartered Singapore (officially Standard Chartered Bank (Singapore) Limited) is the Singapore based subsidiary of British banking and financial services company, Standard Chartered. Opening its first branch in 1859, the bank is one of the oldest in continuous operation in Singapore. The bank received its Qualifying Full Bank (QFB) licence in October 1999, being one of the first foreign banks to qualify for the licence.

The bank (Standard Chartered Bank (Singapore) Limited) was officially incorporated in 2013 to handle Standard Chartered's Singapore Consumer Banking retail and SME banking businesses. In February 2018, operations of Standard Chartered in Singapore was consolidated through the transfer of Commercial Banking, Corporate and Institutional Banking and Private Banking businesses to Standard Chartered Bank (Singapore) Limited.

On 3 August 2020, Standard Chartered Singapore was the first and only bank to be awarded the “Significantly Rooted Foreign Bank” (SRFB) status by the Monetary Authority of Singapore, allowing it to operate additional places of business. It currently operates a network of 9 branches, 5 Priority Banking centres and 15 ATMs in the country. The number of ATMs available for customers is expanded through its shared network under the atm^{5} network with Citibank Singapore, HSBC, Bank of China, Maybank and State Bank of India.

== History ==
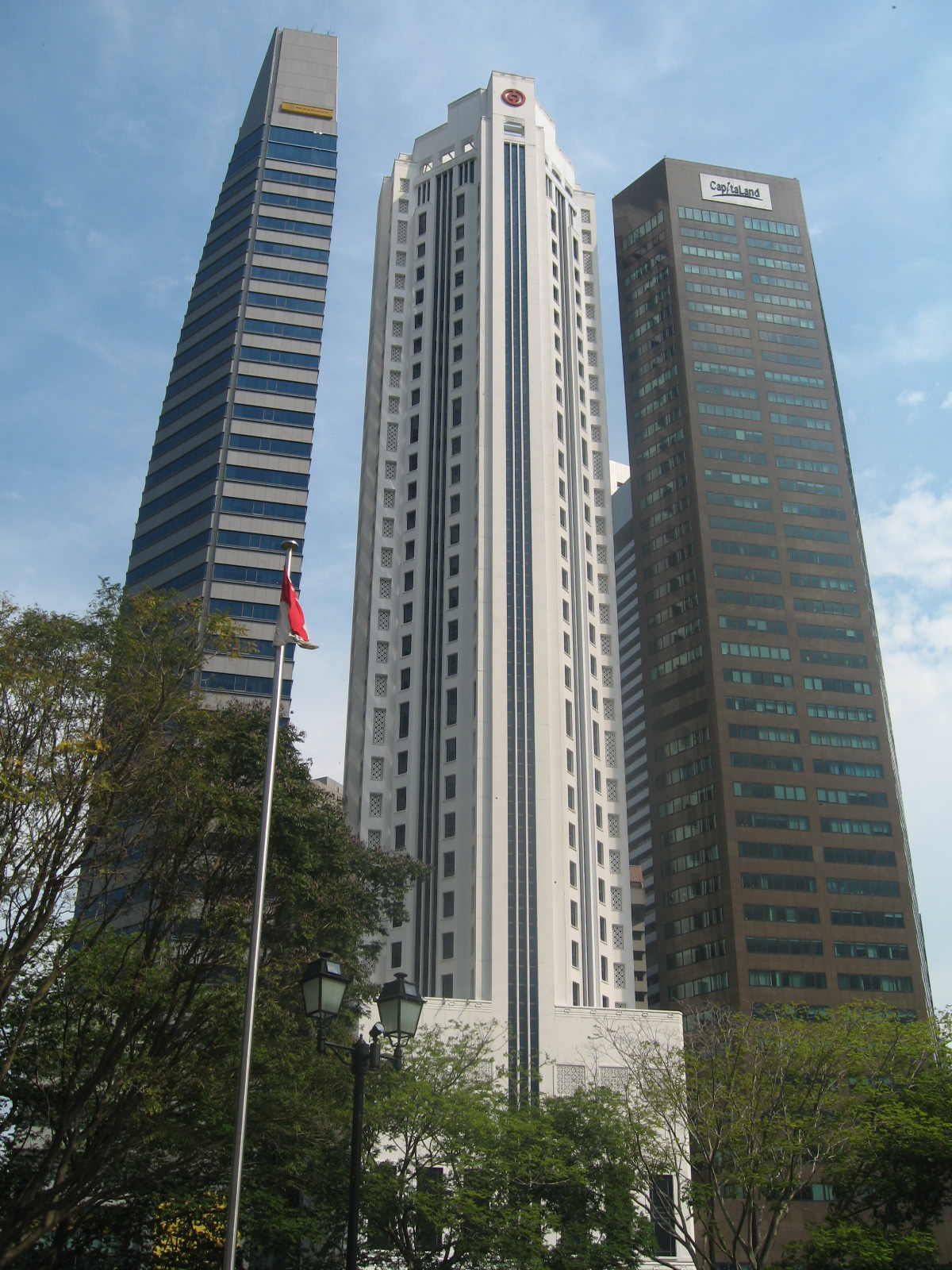
Former Standard Chartered Building (far right).

=== 1860s to 1980s: Founding and establishment of first branch ===
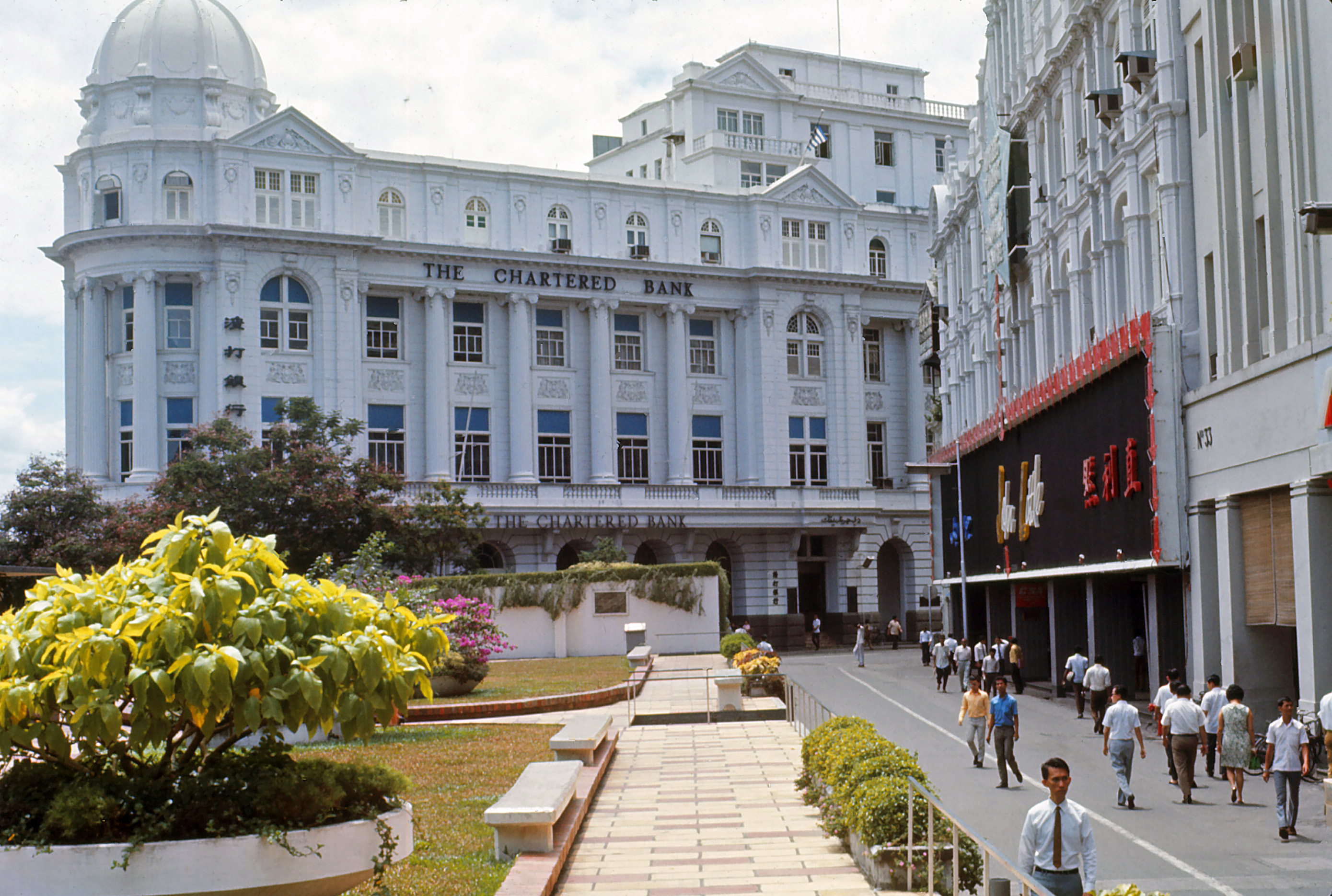
Chartered Bank building (opened 1916) at Raffles Place, pictured in 1971

Opened in early 1859, the bank, then known as Chartered Bank of India, Australia and China, started off as an agency and was situated in a 3 storey tall building located between Flint Street and Battery Road, with the third floor being used for staff accommodations. In 1861, the bank was upgraded to a branch and over the following decades, it printed bank notes in Malaya. In 1913, the bank acquired land situated between Bonham Street and Battery Road and constructed a new building to house its operations in Singapore. The building which was 4 storeys tall, was completed in 1916 and at that time it also housed the Singapore Chamber of Commerce and Exchange.

Construction of a 44 storey tall skyscraper at Battery Road for the bank's head office was completed in 1984. The building, which was known as the Standard Chartered Building, was the largest Standard Chartered building worldwide and it also represented the largest single investment by a British company at that point of time. Officially opened on 24 October 1984 by Anthony Barber, then chairman of the Standard Chartered Bank, the building stood on the site of the bank's first branch when it was first opened in 1859. In 1986, Khoo Teck Puat, the founder of Maybank acquired a significant stake for US$100 million in the bank's parent, Standard Chartered and later became the single largest shareholder of the banking group. Following his death in 2004, the stake valued at £2.3 billion was acquired by Temasek Holdings in 2006, making the investment arm of the Government of Singapore its largest shareholder.

=== 2000s to present: Local incorporation ===
On 28 May 2007, Standard Chartered opened its private banking global headquarters in Singapore and in 2011, the bank was the first financial institution to move its Singapore corporate office to the Marina Bay Financial Centre, after being situated in Raffles Place since 1859. On 7 October 2013, Standard Chartered officially incorporated a local subsidiary of the bank, Standard Chartered Bank (Singapore) Limited. Following the incorporation, the bank's Singapore Consumer Banking retail and SME banking business was transferred to the new subsidiary. In 2018, the operations of Standard Chartered was eventually merged into Standard Chartered Singapore, consolidating all of the group's Singapore operations and becoming the first major foreign bank to do so in Singapore.

== Standard Chartered Singapore Marathon ==
Beginning in 1982, the Singapore Marathon, also known as the Standard Chartered Marathon, is an annual international marathon held on the first Sunday of every December. It is the first competitive marathon in Singapore with an estimated participation size of 15,000 runners at its inaugural race on December 5, 1982. Since then, the race has grown to attract many international marathoners to participate in the annual race and the 2013 event attracted a total of 60,000 entrants for all categories. In 2026, BYD became the new title sponsor of the Singapore Marathon with the marathon now titled as BYD Singapore International Marathon.

=== Incidents ===
In 2017, Standard Chartered Singapore Marathon announced its bid to join the Abbott World Marathon Majors event. In 2019, the full- and half-marathons were held in the evening in order to fulfil criteria to be listed in the Abbott World Marathon Majors, instead of the usual flag off timing at dawn. This caused major traffic disruptions as traffic was at a standstill for 3 hours and drew criticism from the public as wedding banquets held in town also encountered problems, with guests and vendors unable to make the functions in time.
