= Six Battery Road =

Office skyscraper in Singapore

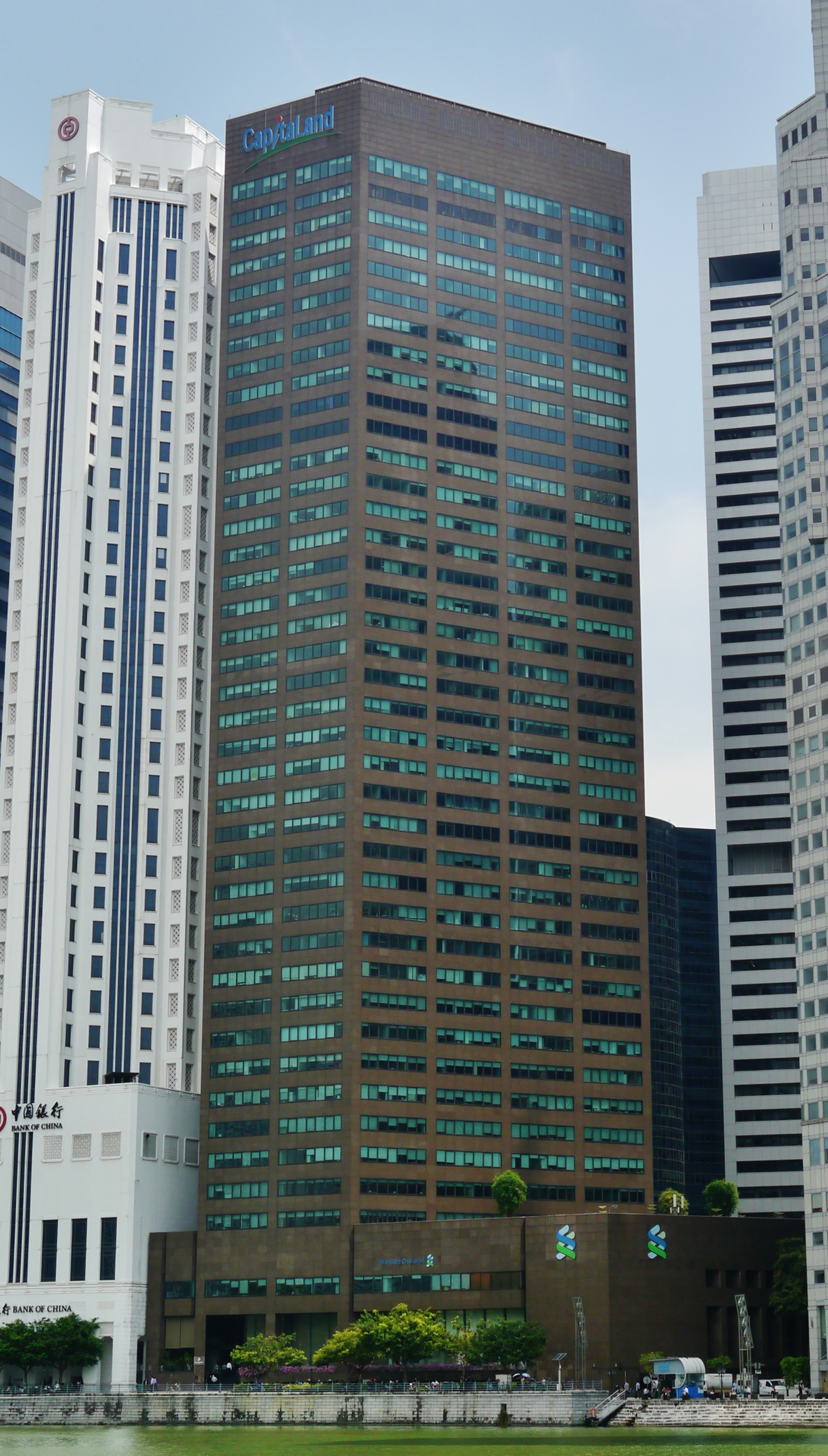
- Six Battery Road in 2015
- Interactive map of the Six Battery Road area
- Former names: Standard Chartered Bank

General information
- Status: Completed
- Type: Commercial offices
- Architectural style: Modernism
- Location: Raffles Place, Downtown Core, Singapore
- Coordinates: 1.285404°N 103.851764°E
- Completed: 1984
- Owner: CapitaCommercial Trust

Height
- Roof: 174 m (571 ft)

Technical details
- Floor count: 44; 3 below ground

Design and construction
- Architects: P&T Group; RSP Architects Planners & Engineers
- Developer: CapitaLand Limited
- Engineer: Meinhardt

Six Battery Road, formerly the Standard Chartered Bank Building, is a high-rise skyscraper located in the central business district of Singapore.

It is located at 6 Battery Road, in Raffles Place. The tower is located adjacent to the Bank of China Building and faces the Singapore River.

It is a class-A office building and houses the offices of several multi-national companies. The development had a net floor area of 46,060 m^{2} (495,800 ft^{2}), as of 30 June 2007, and has direct access to Raffles Place MRT station.

At its completion, it was the largest building for the Standard Chartered Bank worldwide and also represented the largest single investment by a British company. The building is on a 999-year leasehold.

== History ==
Six Battery Road, completed in 1984, was designed by P&T Architects & Engineers Ltd. and RSP Architects Planners & Engineers(Pte) Ltd. The development involved several firms, including CapitaLand Commercial Limited, Clover Properties Private Limited, Hazama Gumi, CapitaLand Limited, Lighting Design Partnership, Meinhardt (Singapore) Private Limited, and Sidley Austin Brown & Wood LLP.

The building was inaugurated on 24 October 1984 by Lord Barber, then chairman of the Standard Chartered Bank Group, which served as the anchor tenant. Subsequently, the 1st, 20th, 21st, 43rd, and 44th floors underwent renovation, completed in March 2002."

== Architecture ==
Six Battery Road has a baltic brown granite exterior and is mainly made out of concrete. Despite the building being a British investment, it was feng-shui (Chinese geomancy) tested. Even the opening date was chosen as it was a propitious day according to the Chinese Almanac.

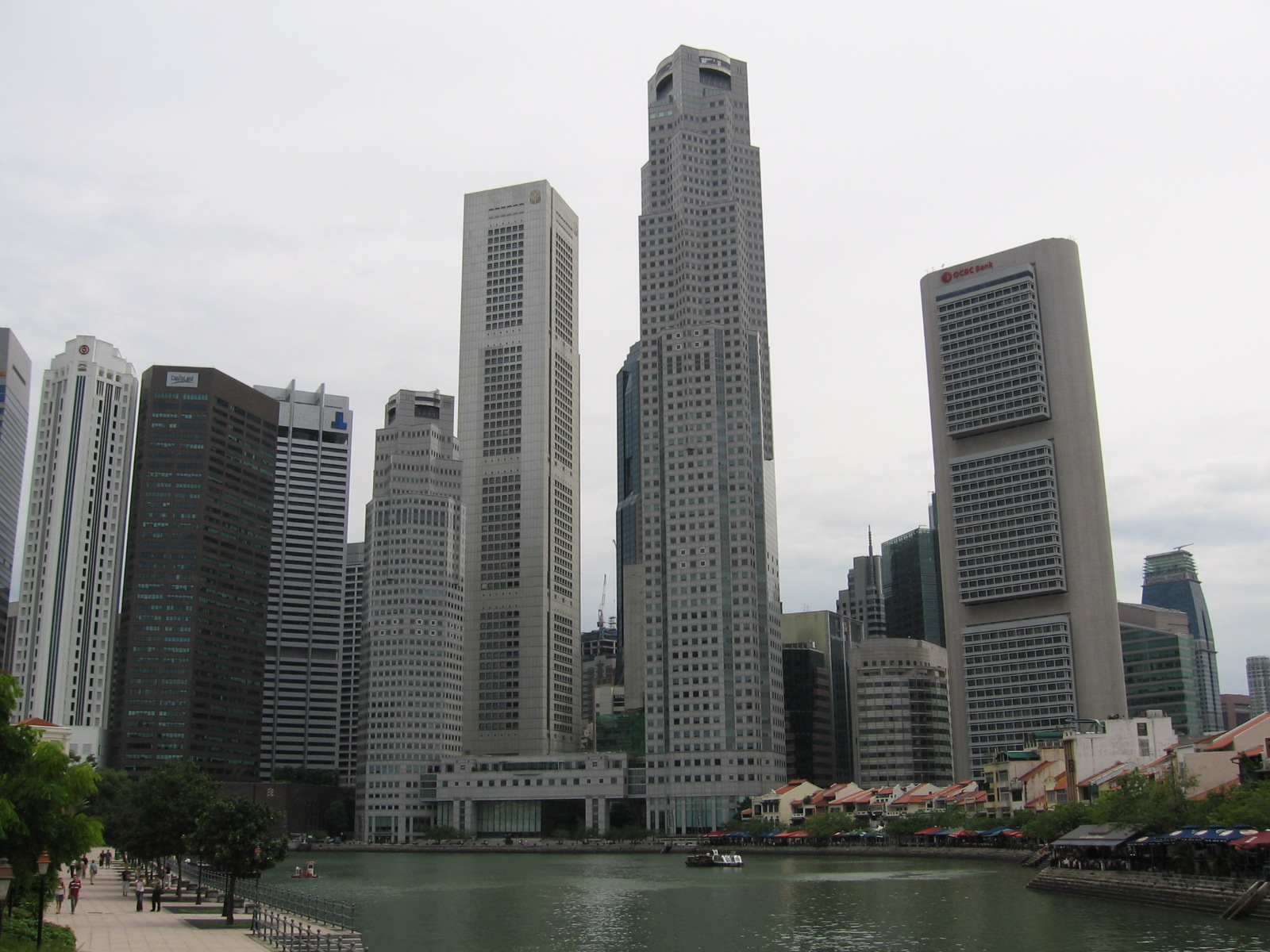
Six Battery Road (brown building on left) is in many photographs of the Singapore skyline.

== See also ==
- List of tallest buildings in Singapore
- Raffles Place
