= Citibank Singapore =

Singaporean division of Citibank N.A.

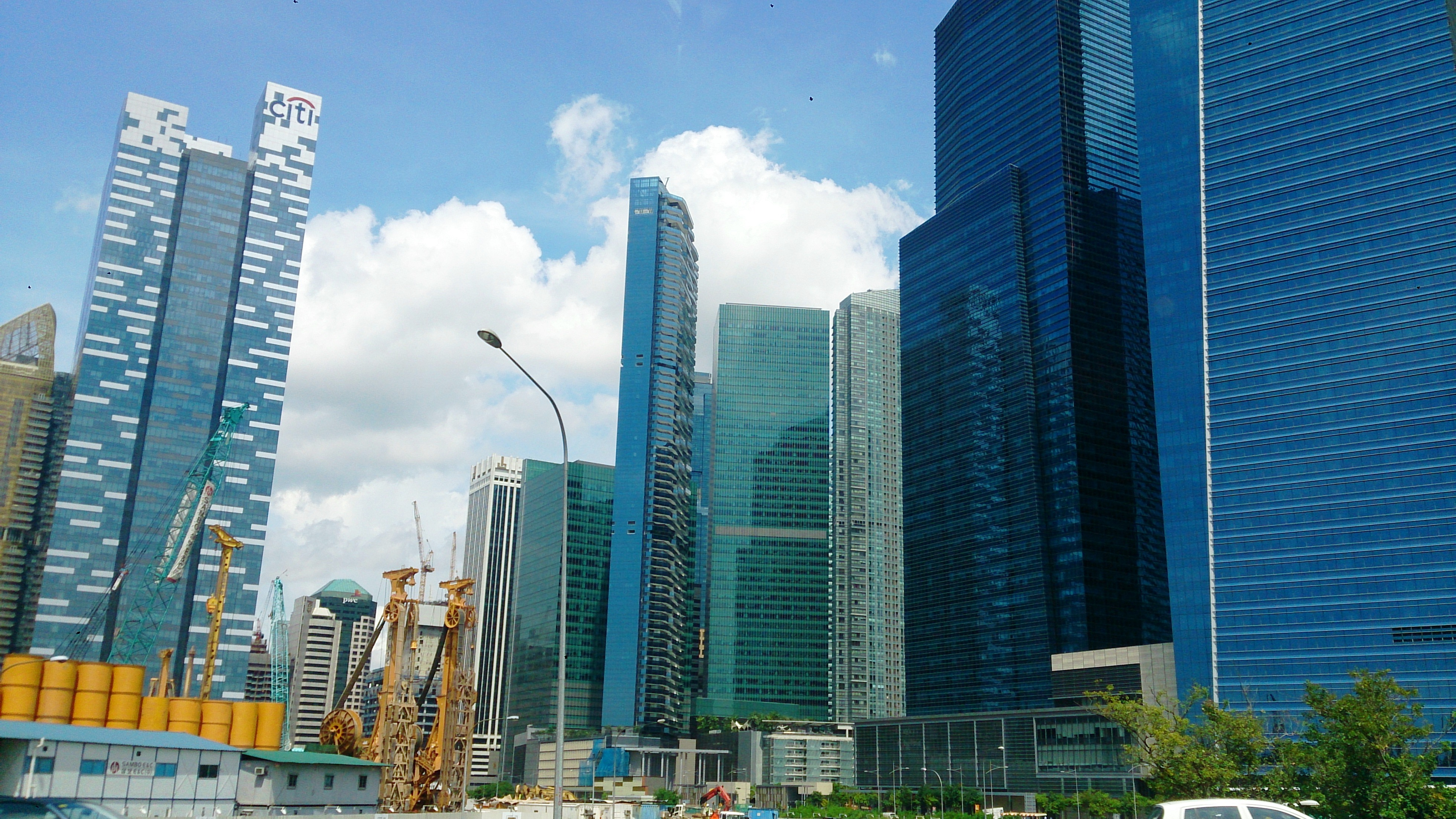
- The anchor tenant of Tower 1 of Asia Square, on the left of this view of the skyline of the Downtown Core, is Citibank Singapore
- Type: Subsidiary of Citigroup
- Industry: Banking, financial services
- Founded: 1902; 124 years ago
- Headquarters: 8 Marina View; Asia Square; Tower 1, #21-00; Singapore 018960,
- Area served: Singapore; Worldwide (via Citibank International Personal Bank Singapore)
- Products: Credit cards Retail banking Commercial banking Investment banking Private banking Financial analysis E-Brokerage
- Website: www.citibank.com.sg www.ipb.citibank.com.sg

Citibank Singapore Limited is a division of Citibank N.A. of the United States and incorporated in Singapore on 28 June 2004. Its parent was awarded Qualifying Full Bank (QFB) status on 20 October 1999, and this status was transferred to the Singapore division on the day of its incorporation. The bank has a shared automated teller machine (ATM) network with HSBC, State Bank of India, Maybank, The Royal Bank of Scotland, Bank of China, and Standard Chartered Singapore called atm^{5}.

The bank's headquarters are located at Asia Square. The main branch is at Capital Square at 23 Church Street. With the QFB status, the bank was entitled to open up to 25 branches, with up to ten from 1 January 2005. Back-end operations are concentrated in Changi Business Park.

== History ==
Citibank established operations in Singapore on 1 July 1902. It was then known as the International Banking Corporation (IBC) and was the first United States bank to set up a branch in Singapore. Located at 1 Prince Street, IBC was primarily involved in the trade financing of Malayan rubber and tin exports in the early 20th century.

In the 1980s, Citibank was the first bank in Singapore to popularise the use of automated teller machines (ATMs). Citibank established its Global Consumer Banking division in 1982 to cater to the needs of individuals and small businesses. In the early 1990s, it created Singapore's first telephone banking service which was staffed 24 hours a day by CitiPhone officers.

Although a relative latecomer to the retail-banking sector, the bank has grown into a formidable market player with a major market share in key businesses including unsecured lending, deposits and investments and secured assets. Citibank was among the first four foreign banks to be awarded a Qualifying Full Bank (QFB) licence by the Monetary Authority of Singapore (MAS) in 1999.

In June 2002, Citibank was the first QFB-licensed bank in Singapore to offer the Visa global debit service, and the following July it was the first in Singapore to introduce a debit card cashback scheme through the Visa platform. Called Citibank Instant Cash, the scheme allows customers who hold an International Citicard with the Visa point-of-sale debit feature to withdraw funds from their Citibank accounts when making purchase payments at retail locations.

In 2019, Citibank had 15 branches across Singapore.

In Oct 2024, the bank closed the Jurong East branch, which is its last regular branch in Singapore. This move was to shift the bank's focus towards online banking and targeting its service at high net-wealth clients via its wealth hubs.

== Citibank Singapore ==
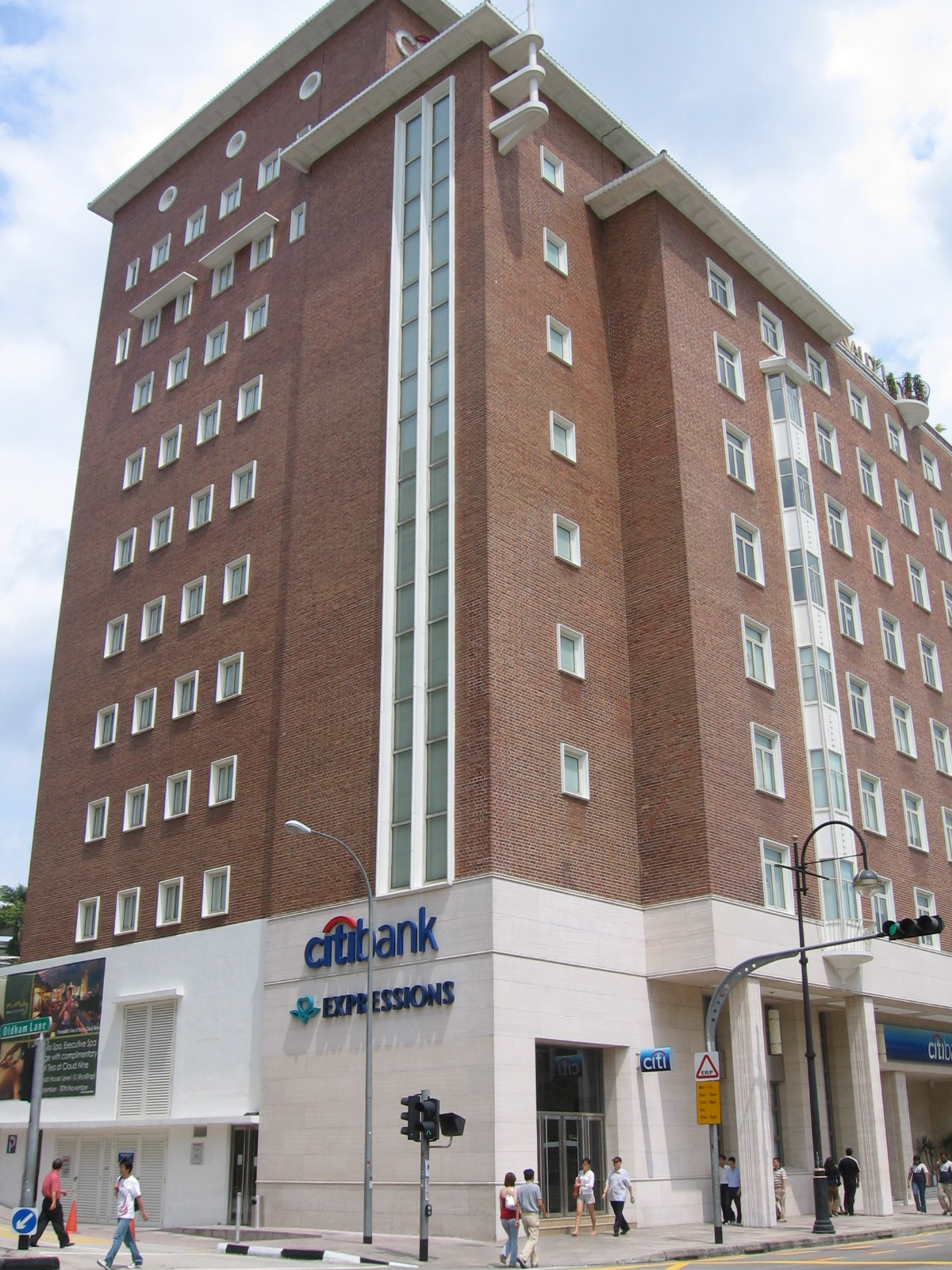
Citibank Singapore's branch in MacDonald House, which is a national monument

In June 2004, Citibank announced that it would be incorporating a wholly owned subsidiary of Citigroup in Singapore, known as Citibank Singapore Limited, with a paid-up capital of S$1.5 billion. This move, which saw Citibank becoming the first foreign bank to do so, came as part of Citibank's strategy to grow its international businesses and reaffirmed the bank's long-term commitment to the Singapore. The new entity began functioning on 1 January 2005.

CitiBusiness Singapore is a unit of Citibank Singapore Ltd that serves small and medium enterprises (SMEs). It was launched in Singapore in 2005.

=== International Personal Bank ===
Citibank International Personal Bank Singapore (IPB), a division of Citibank Singapore Limited, was established to meet the offshore banking needs of individuals residing outside of Singapore. Currently, Citibank International Personal Bank Singapore has one branch in Jurong.

== Citibank Business Singapore ==
Citibank Business Singapore has 3 mini branches for Citigold clients, 1 main branch at Jurong East and 37 ATMs islandwide

=== Time Line ===
2006- CitiBusiness Singapore enhanced its SME offerings by introducing services and products that were traditionally only offered by banks to larger corporations.

=== Products and services ===
Citibank Business Singapore offers its customers facilities such as cash management, loans, foreign exchange facilities, monetary options to engage in trade, credit cards and other value added services.

=== Sponsorship and CSR ===
As part of its CSR, CitiBusiness Singapore is the main sponsor for the Singapore Prestige Brand Award (SPBA), which is organised by the Association of Small and Medium Enterprises (ASME) and Lianhe Zaobao, a Chinese language newspaper.
