= Marina Boulevard =

Road along western Marina Bay, Singapore

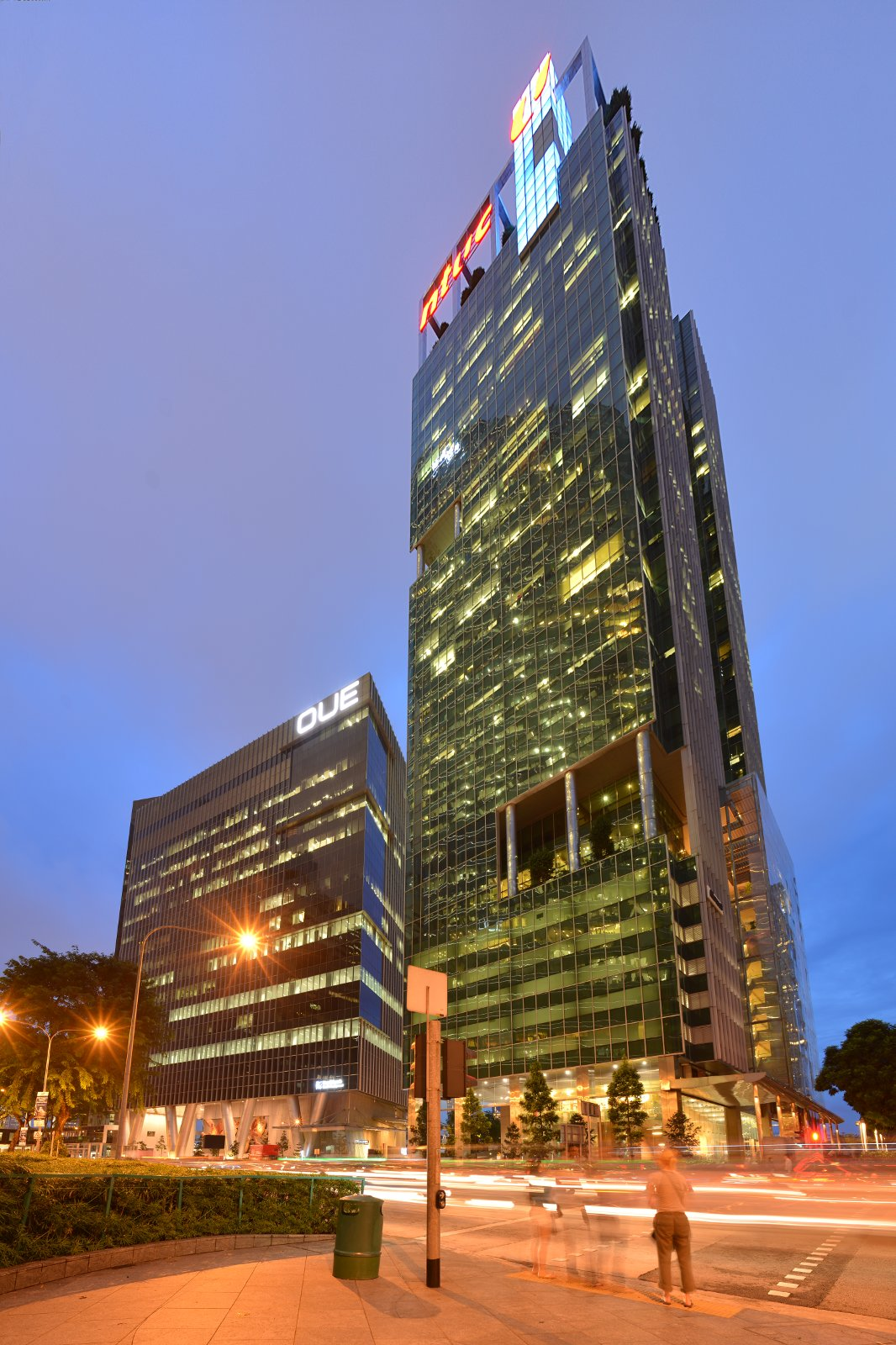
One Marina Boulevard, an office building along Marina Boulevard

Marina Boulevard is a road in Singapore running along the western side of Marina Bay in the Downtown Core district. Starting at Raffles Place intersecting with Collyer Quay and running south, there are a number of landmark buildings along the length of it such as the One Marina Boulevard and One Raffles Quay, forming bookends of its northern terminus.

Located along the road is The Sail @ Marina Bay, The Promontory, Central Linear Park, Marina Bay Financial Centre, Gardens by the Bay, Marina South Pier and Marina South. The Common Services Tunnel runs underneath it. The first part of the road from Coller Quay to Marina View Link is a two-way street and the part from Marina View Link to the East Coast Parkway is a five-lane, one-way road towards the latter.
