= Bank of Singapore =

Singaporean private bank

- Type: Subsidiary
- Industry: Private banking and wealth management
- Predecessor: ING Asia Private Bank
- Founded: 29 January 2010; 16 years ago
- Headquarters: Singapore
- Key people: Jason Moo (CEO)
- Products: Wealth planning, asset preservation, alternative investment
- Number of employees: More than 2,300
- Parent: OCBC Group
- Website: www.bankofsingapore.com

Bank of Singapore is the private banking arm and a wholly owned subsidiary of Oversea-Chinese Banking Corporation (OCBC), Southeast Asia's second largest bank.

Formerly known as ING Asia Private Bank, it was acquired by OCBC in 2009 from ING Group for US$1.46 billion. After completing the acquisition, OCBC subsequently combined ING Asia Private Bank with its own private banking business (OCBC Private Bank), and renamed as Bank of Singapore in January 2010.

The Bank of Singapore serves high net worth individuals and wealthy families in its key markets of Southeast Asia, Greater China, India Sub-Continent and other international markets.

Headquartered in Singapore, the Bank of Singapore has branches in Hong Kong and Dubai, with a representative office in Makati City, Philippines. In Europe, the bank serves clients through BOS Wealth Management Europe Société Anonyme (S.A.) which is headquartered in Luxembourg and has a London office. In Malaysia, it serves its clients through BOS Wealth Management Malaysia Berhad. Bank of Singapore is rated Aa1 by Moody's.

== History ==
In October 2009, OCBC acquired ING Asia Private Bank as a result of ING's restructuring plan, following a government bailout of ING Group in 2008, due to the 2008 financial crisis. After completing the acquisition, Bank of Singapore was launched on 29 January 2010 from the combination of ING Asia Private Bank and OCBC Private Bank. Its current headquarters, the Bank of Singapore Centre at Market Street which is located in the heart of Raffles Place, was officially opened on 22 June 2011.

In April 2016, OCBC announced that Bank of Singapore, its private banking subsidiary, had acquired the wealth and investment management business of Barclays in Singapore and Hong Kong. The transaction was completed in November 2016, with US$13 billion of assets transferred to Bank of Singapore. More than 60 private bankers from Barclays joined Bank of Singapore as a result of the acquisition.

Bank of Singapore partnered with the Wealth Management Institute and Nanyang Technological University to launch an Advanced Diploma in Private Banking Programme for its private bankers in May 2016.

In October 2016, Bank of Singapore announced that DZ PRIVATBANK Singapore will refer their clients to the bank as it ceases its operations in Singapore. DZ PRIVATBANK is a subsidiary of the third largest bank in Germany, DZ Bank AG.

In November 2016, Bank of Singapore received regulatory approval to operate a branch in Dubai International Financial Centre (DIFC). The branch was officially opened on 19 February 2017 by the Deputy Ruler of Dubai and President of Dubai International Financial Centre – His Highness Sheikh Maktoum bin Mohammed bin Rashid Al Maktoum.

In July 2018, Bank of Singapore was granted an investment company license to operate a wealth management subsidiary in Luxembourg – a first for a Singapore private bank.

BOS Wealth Management Europe S.A. was officially launched on 1 April 2019 in Luxembourg. The official opening for its UK branch in London was held the next day.

In June 2022, OCBC Group launched BOS Wealth Management Malaysia (BOSWM Malaysia), its first onshore wealth management entity outside Singapore. The entity provides wealth management and investment advisory services to ultra-high-net-worth and high-net-worth clients in Malaysia. Its official opening ceremony was held on 1 June 2022, the same day of its launch.

== Services ==
Supported by credit ratings of its parent company, OCBC, which is rated AA− by Fitch and S&P Global Ratings, Bank of Singapore serves high-net-worth individuals and families across key markets. The bank provides private banking, wealth management, investment, financing, and succession planning services.

Through its open-architecture platform, Bank of Singapore offers clients access to a range of investment products and wealth planning solutions. Clients may also access banking, corporate finance, treasury, financing, insurance, and brokerage services available across the OCBC Group.

The bank has received multiple industry recognitions, including Singapore’s Best for CIO and Singapore’s Best for high-net-worth by Euromoney in 2026, and Best Private Bank for Intermediaries by Asian Private Banker and Citywire in 2025.

== Controversies ==
=== Breaches of money laundering laws ===
On 19 October 2022, BOS Wealth Management Europe S.A., the Luxembourg-based European wealth management arm of Bank of Singapore, was fined €210,000 by Luxembourg's financial regulator Commission de Surveillance du Secteur Financier (CSSF) for non-compliance with laws on the fight against money laundering and combatting the financing of terrorism.

=== Anti-money laundering (AML) related contraventions fine ===
On 10 November 2022, the Dubai Financial Services Authority (DFSA) imposed a US$1.12 million fine on the Dubai International Financial Centre (DIFC) branch of Bank of Singapore for a number of contraventions, such as inadequate systems and controls, and shortfalls relating to anti-money laundering. DFSA found deficiencies in the bank's AML business risk assessments; assessment of risks posed by its clients; customer due diligence and enhanced customer due diligence practices; identification of clients' source of wealth and funds; and suspicious activity reporting.
