= 2013 in Singapore =

- Decades: 1990s; 2000s; 2010s; 2020s
- See also: Other events of 2013; Timeline of Singaporean history

The following lists events that happened during 2013 in the Republic of Singapore.

== Incumbents ==
- President: Tony Tan Keng Yam
- Prime Minister: Lee Hsien Loong

== Events ==
=== January ===
- 1 January – Cheng Lim LRT station is opened for service. At the same time, trains on the Sengkang West line will run in both directions too.
- 2 January – The Personal Data Protection Commission is formed to enforce data privacy laws.

ITE College Central and Headquarters at Ang Mo Kio premises is opened.

- 10 January – The North East MRT line is disrupted for nearly seven hours between HarbourFront MRT station to Outram Park MRT station.
- 14 January – Halimah Yacob is elected Speaker of the Parliament of Singapore, making her the first female speaker in Singapore.
- 15 January – The smoking ban is extended to common areas of residential buildings, sheltered linkways and walkways, overhead pedestrian bridges, within 5m of bus stops and outside hospitals.
- 17 January – The Land Transport Authority announced several new MRT lines to be built, doubling the total MRT network to 360 km (220 miles) by 2030. They are the Jurong Region MRT line, Downtown MRT line extension and Circle MRT line Stage 6 by 2025, North East MRT line extension to Punggol North and Cross Island MRT line by 2030, as well as a possible new station on the North–South MRT line. A section of the Cross Island Line is to run under the Central Catchment Nature Reserve, sparking a controversy with nature groups.
- 21 January –
  - MediaCorp Channel NewsAsia begins broadcasting 24 hours daily.
  - 1-week paternity leave is introduced as part of enhancements to the Marriage and Parenthood package, taking effect on 1 May. The leave can also be shared with mums too, and is extended to 2 weeks in 2015. Other measures include a four-week mandatory adoption leave, two days of childcare leave per year for parents of those aged seven to 12 years old, extending maternity protection to an entire pregnancy, and allowing expectant mothers not eligible for leave to claim a cash benefit substitute.
- 22 January – Singapore Institute of Technology's campus at Nanyang Polytechnic, known as SIT@NYP, starts construction, which will finish by 2014. The building will house the Newcastle University, Trinity College Dublin and The University of Manchester.
- 24 January – Plans are announced to enhance public transport. By 2018, lifts will be installed at 40 more overhead bridges near public transport nodes, and more than 200 km of new shelters will be built as part of a new Walk2Ride programme launched. Finally, 20 km (12 miles) more noise barriers will be built by 2020, and trials on road noise barriers are being done too.
- 26 January – Lee Li Lian, representing the main opposition party Workers' Party, was elected as Member-of-Parliament (MP) for Punggol East Single Member Constituency after winning the 2013 Punggol East by-election. She succeeded Michael Palmer, former People's Action Party's MP, who vacated his seat on 12 December last year because of an extramarital affair. Lee is sworn into Parliament on 4 February.
- 29 January –
  - The Population White Paper (a White Paper focusing on population) is released. The report projects a future population of 6.9 million by 2030, with 3 strategies proposed. The report's findings have caused controversy, culminating in a protest on 16 February which attracted 4,000 people.
  - Singapore Institute of Technology's campus at Republic Polytechnic, known as SIT@RP, starts construction, which will finish by 2014. The building will house the University of Glasgow. It is the tallest SIT building at nine storeys tall.
- 30 January – Thai tycoon Charoen Sirivadhanabhakdi wins control of Fraser and Neave (F&N), a property, food & beverage firm.
- 31 January –
  - The Ministry of National Development released a Land Use Plan for land use changes towards 2030. Among them are more new towns, more green spaces, reclamation of land, acquisition of golf courses, moving of defence activities to Pulau Tekong, and two new commercial hubs (the North Coast Innovation Corridor and Southern Waterfront City).
  - library@chinatown opens in Chinatown Point.

=== February ===
- 1 February – MediaCorp launches Toggle, an over-the-top service (OTT).
- 4 to 8 February – Parliament convenes a special session to debate the controversial Population White Paper. The White Paper is passed with a vote of 77–13 after amendments to focus less on population and more on infrastructure development.
- 9 February – WE Cinemas will close both of its cinemas in West Mall and Suntec City.
- 10 February – MediaCorp TV celebrates its 50-year anniversary since being established in 1963 (before on 16 February).
- 14 February – Former Central Narcotics Bureau chief Ng Boon Gay is acquitted from a sex-for-contracts case.
- 19 February – Singapore and Malaysia agree to build the high-speed rail link between the city-state island republic and mainland towards Kuala Lumpur.
- 21 February –
  - Uber launches its services in Singapore.
  - The Singapore Third Series coins is unveiled with designs of Singapore's icons, which will start circulation in the middle of 2013.

=== March ===
- 1 March – The Sesame Street Spaghetti Space Chase is officially opened at Universal Studios Singapore.
- 13 March – The Ministry of Education announced that 15 MOE Kindergartens will be set up over the next three years, with the first five opening next year.
- 14 March – The Ministry of Social and Family Development announced the setting up of 20 Social Service Offices (SSOs) to help needy Singaporeans.
- 15 March – Singaporeans and PRs will get free museum entry from 18 May to promote Singapore's heritage.
- 31 March – MediaCorp TV Channel 5 celebrates its 50-year anniversary since being established in 1963 (before on 2 April).

=== April ===
- 1 April –
  - The Singapore Accountancy Commission is formed to regulate the accountancy sector.
  - The Early Childhood Development Agency is formed to oversee both kindergartens and childcare centres. ECDA is overseen by both the Ministry of Education and Ministry of Social and Family Development, being housed in the latter.
  - All 57 Shop N Save supermarkets are rebranded to Giant, except for the West Mall store, which will become a Cold Storage store.
- 3 April – River Safari opens to the public.

=== May ===
- 2 May – Construction works commence on the Tanjong Pagar Centre (now Guoco Tower), a mixed-use tower. It will be the tallest building in Singapore at a height of 290m, more than One Raffles Place, Republic Plaza and UOB Plaza One, standing at 280m (the maximum allowed in Singapore). The building is completed in 2016.
- 15 May –
  - City Harvest Church Criminal Breach of Trust Case: A 140-day-long trial involving Kong Hee and five other pastors, who were arrested in June 2012 over alleged misuse of funds, begins.
  - The Marina Bay Financial Centre is officially opened as a new business hub.
  - Singapore Kindness Movement retires Singa the Courtesy Lion through a resignation letter.
- 27 May – Filmmaker Anthony Chen snags a Camera d'Or for the film Ilo Ilo. The film is eventually shown in cinemas from 29 August.
- 28 May – Former NUS professor Tey Tsun Hang is found guilty in a sex-for-grades case, and thus sentenced to a 5-month jail term. The conviction is subsequently overturned in 2014.
- 29 May – 2013 dengue outbreak in Singapore: A man from Hougang dies from dengue shock syndrome; the first reported death case relating to dengue in Singapore this year.
- 31 May – Peter Lim Sim Pang, a former Singapore Civil Defence Force commissioner, is found guilty in a sex-for-contracts scandal involving three women, subsequently sentenced on 13 June to six months in jail.

=== June ===
- 1 June – A new licence scheme for news websites take effect. They apply when websites report an average of at least one article per week on Singapore's affairs and attract 50,000 unique visitors or more over two months. A performance bond must also be put up and objectionable content must be removed within 24 hours. The new rules resulted in several bloggers and websites holding protests against them.
- 12 June – After a series of financial troubles, the Changi Motorsports Hub project is called off.
- 15 June – Jem opens its doors after delays due to tenancy permit issues.
- Mid-June: 2013 Southeast Asian haze: Singapore sees its worst haze since 1997:
  - 17 June: At about 10pm, the 3-hour Pollutant Standards Index (PSI) levels reading reached an unhealthy range of 155 after air quality plummeted into the "Unhealthy" range at 2pm.
  - 19 June: At 9pm, the 3-hour PSI reaches 290, surpassing the previous record of 226 in 1997. At 10pm, the 3-hour PSI reading reaches 321 marking the first time air quality reached "Hazardous" levels.
  - 20 June: At about 1pm, the 3-hour PSI reading reaches 371.
  - 21 June – The 3-hour PSI reaches 400 at 11am, peaking at 401 at 12pm. This makes it the highest PSI reading in history.
- 25 June – The third series of Singapore's coins is released. However, old coins from the 1st and 2nd series remain legal tender.

=== July ===
- 10 July – The Kovan Double Murders – A father and son was murdered in the father's home at Hillside Drive. The case was so named due to the son's body was dragged under a car for 1 km before being dislodged outside Kovan MRT station. The killer, a former police officer named Iskandar bin Rahmat was tried and convicted for murder, and sentenced to death.
- 27 July – The National Environment Agency announced that the Tray Return Initiative will be rolled out to all hawker centres in three phases. This comes after a successful trial in 2012.

=== August ===
- 5 August – 2013 dengue outbreak in Singapore: The number of reported dengue cases reached about 14,000 at the time (including six deaths), surpassing the former record of 14,209 cases from 2005. This becomes the worst dengue epidemic in Singapore (since surpassed in 2020), with a total 22,318 cases (including eight deaths) logged by end-2013.
- 10 August – The Our Singapore Conversation engagements are completed, with a newsletter called Reflections released detailing five "aspirations" to guide future policies. There will be policy changes including a revamp to the Primary School Leaving Examination.
- 15 August – CleanTech One is officially opened, boosting the eco industry in Singapore.
- 18 August – Plans are unveiled to build Project Jewel and Changi T5 (including a third runway). In addition, all port activities will be consolidated in Tuas to create a Southern Waterfront City, and Paya Lebar Air Base will move to Changi East Air Base with a new fourth runway to free up land and lift height restrictions around the area.
- 19 August – The Ministry of Education announced that 40 places will be reserved in each primary school for those without prior ties to the school. This move aims to increase opportunities for those to study in popular schools and integration.
- 29 August – The Housing and Development Board (HDB) unveils new housing plans for Bidadari, Tampines North and Punggol Matilda.
- 30 August – The Ministry of Health announced Health City Novena, a new health complex in central Singapore. The 17-hectare complex will have 10 buildings connected by bridges and underground links, which will be fully completed by 2030.

=== September ===
- 2 September – The Energy Market Authority imposes a $1.5m fine for a gas leak on Jurong Island on 23 April 2012.
- 5 September – Flash floods strike western Singapore due to heavy rain, causing a section of AYE to close. As a result, the Public Utilities Board announced the building of tidal gates and expansion of the canal to take in more rain.
- 13 September – The Expressway Monitoring and Advisory System signs will be upgraded to be more readable with different colours and display real-time traffic information to help motorists make better decisions. The exercise will be completed by 2017.
- 18 September –
  - The Tuaspring Desalination Plant is officially opened.
  - A ceiling collapse happens at Jem due to a leaking water pipe, injuring three. Jem is subsequently shut until 2 October.
- 23 September – The Fair Consideration Framework is announced in a bid to ensure Singaporeans have fair opportunities for jobs.
- 30 September –
  - MediaCorp Teletext ceases transmission due to declining usage. In its heyday, Teletext served as a platform to receive news and information about Singapore.
  - Dolphin Island opens at the Marine Life Park at Resorts World Sentosa, featuring bottlenose dolphins.

=== October ===
- October to November – 2013 Singapore cyberattacks: Many of the cyberattacks occurred in Singapore, a YouTube video, made of Anonymus Hacker Group's The Messiah threatening the Singapore government. Affected websites include the PAP Community Foundation, the Ang Mo Kio Town Council page (a town council led by the Prime Minister Lee Hsien Loong), Yahoo! Singapore, Seletar Airport, Prime Minister's Office and The Istana, as well as 13 schools on a single server.
- 4 October – A penny stock crash occurs on the Singapore Exchange (SGX), causing a S$8 billion wipeout involving 3 stocks. The Monetary Authority of Singapore, SGX and Commercial Affairs Department had commenced investigations on that, resulting in 3 arrests. All have since been slapped with charges with 1 sentenced to jail in 2019.
- 7 October –
  - The Land Transport Master Plan 2013 is released, which will include 200 km of sheltered walkways, 700 km of cycling paths, more ITHs, more trains and buses, an upgraded signalling system and more lifts.
  - Veteran National football player and coach, V. Sundramoorthy resigns as LionsXII and National U-23 coach. He is replaced by Fandi Ahmad on 7 December.
- 10 October – StarHub launches SuperSports Arena (renamed to Hub Sports Arena) for all households in Singapore to promote Singapore sports.
- 17 October – National University of Singapore's U Town is officially opened, encouraging students and professors to learn and live together.
- 21 October – GrabTaxi is launched in Singapore.
- 24 October – The Singapore Institute of Technology (SIT) announced a slew of its own degree programmes which will start from 2014. This is in preparation of SIT becoming the fifth autonomous university in Singapore, as it currently offers degree programmes with foreign universities.
- 25 October – The Disease Outbreak Response System Condition (DORSCON) is revised to consider severity in addition to the spread of diseases in Singapore. Control measures are made more flexible with four colour alerts instead of five, allowing the framework to be used for both mild and severe diseases.
- 27 October – The Sengkang General Hospital and Sengkang Community Hospital have started construction, first announced in 2011 by the Ministry of Health. These hospitals will be completed by 2018.

=== November ===
- 5 November – Changi Airport's Terminal 4 starts construction with completion by 2017. It will be able to handle 16 million passengers per year with new concepts tested like self-service options.
- 8 November – ITE's new headquarters and ITE College Central in Ang Mo Kio is officially opened, marking the completion of the 'One ITE System, Three Colleges' initiative. In addition, a review to improve polytechnic and ITE education to strengthen employment chances called the Applied Study in the Polytechnics and ITE Review (ASPIRE) is announced, to be finished by 2014.
- 12 November – 2013 Singapore cyberattacks: James Raj, the mastermind who is alleged "The Messiah", is charged in Singapore court. He has since been found guilty and sentenced to 56 months jail in 2015.
- 14 November – The Ministry of Education announced a trial of Subject-Based Banding in 12 secondary schools from 2014.
- 24 November – MediaCorp TV Channel 8 celebrates its 50-year anniversary since being established on 23 November 1963.
- 30 November – The first Purple Parade is held to raise awareness of the special needs community.

=== December ===
- 2 December – Westgate, a shopping mall in Jurong East opened its doors.
- 3 December – Bedok Mall opened its doors.
- 7 December – River Safari's Amazon River Quest opens to the public, completing the attraction. The ride simulates the Amazon River.
- 8 December – 2013 Little India riots: A riot broke out on the streets of Little India, with 27 arrests, many injuries and several emergency vehicles overturned. One bus front windscreen was smashed. This was the second riot in post-independence Singapore, after the race riots in 1969.
- 12 December – After the Little India riots, a temporary alcohol ban is announced from 14 to 16 December, with Little India declared a "proclaimed area" under the Public Order (Preservation) Act. In addition, all private bus services to dormitories are suspended on 16 December, with more activities to be organised outside Little India and in dormitories.
- 18 December –
  - A near four-hour disruption of services for Circle MRT line for 23 out of 28 stations.
  - An alcohol consumption ban in Little India for weekends, public holidays and eve of public holidays will continue for six months with some shops allowed to sell alcohol with conditions. Bus services will resume with half the fleet and a shorter time.
- 22 December – Opening of the Downtown MRT line Stage 1, stretching from Bugis MRT station to Bayfront and Chinatown MRT station.
- 29 December – Opening of the Marina Coastal Expressway (MCE), Singapore first undersea expressway. The expressway has the most number of lanes in Singapore with five in each direction.

== Deaths ==
- 22 January – John Cheng, actor and getai compère (b. 1961).
- 10 February – Gwee Yee Hean, educator and history researcher (b. 1929).
- 20 April – Huang Wenyong, Malaysian-born Singaporean MediaCorp artiste (b. 1952).
- 22 April – Lee Yong Kiat, pioneering physician (b. 1928).
- 12 May – Dai Peng, veteran Singaporean mediacorp actor (b. 1938).
- 26 May – Wee Toon Boon, former Minister of State for Defence and Environment and former PAP Member of Parliament for Sepoy Lines Constituency (b. 1929).
- 21 June – Venerable Beow Teng, 6th President of the Singapore Buddhist Federation (b. 1916).
- 10 July – Tan Boon Sin (b. 1946) and Tan Chee Heong (b. 1971), murder victims of the Kovan double murders.
- 7 July – Cheng Tsang Man, founder of Prima Group, Singapore's first flour mill (b. 1916).
- 26 September – Tang I-Fang, veteran public servant and businessman (b. 1924).
- 28 December – Dexmon Chua, murder victim of Chia Kee Chen (b. 1976).
