= List of disasters in Singapore by death toll =

This list of Singaporean disasters by death toll includes major disasters (excluding acts of war) that occurred on Singaporean soil or involved Singaporean citizens, in a definable incident.

== 100 or more deaths ==
Fatalities	Year	Article	Type	Comments
2,024	2020-2023	COVID-19	Pandemic	Over 2,000 people died in Singapore as a result of the COVID-19 pandemic, making it the deadliest disaster in the history of the country.

== 99 to 10 deaths ==
Fatalities	Year	Incident Name	Type	Comments
76	1978	Spyros disaster	Industrial explosion and fire	An explosion and flash fire occurred on the Greek tanker Spyros while in a Singaporean shipyard
33	1986	Collapse of Hotel New World	Building collapse	A hotel in Rochor district collapsed due to errors during construction
33	2003	2002–2004 SARS outbreak	Epidemic	
33	1954	1954 BOAC Lockheed Constellation crash	Plane crash	A passenger plane struck a seawall while landing killing all on board
32	2020	2020 dengue outbreak	Epidemic	
27	1951	MV Dromus	Ship explosion	A British tanker exploded while in Singapore Harbour
27	2005	2005 dengue outbreak	Epidemic	
18	2009	2009 swine flu pandemic	Pandemic	
12 (Singaporeans)	2000	Singapore Airlines Flight 006	Plane crash	
10	2017	USS John S. McCain and Alnic MC collision	Ship collision	A US Warship collided with a Liberian tanker offshore of Singapore killing 10 US Navy sailors.

== Less than 10 deaths ==
Fatalities	Year	Incident Name	Type	Comments
9	1972	1972 Robinsons department store fire	Building fire	A fire caused by a short circuit killed nine people in a department store.
9 (Singaporeans)	2004	2004 Boxing Day tsunami	Tsunami	
8	2013	2013 dengue outbreak	Epidemic	
7	1978	1978 Singapore flood	Flood	
7	1983	Singapore cable car crash	Cable car accident	
7	1954	Singapore Flood of 1954	Flood	
6	2006-2007	2006–2007 Southeast Asian floods	Floods	
6	1957	1957 Singapore de Havilland Venom crash	Plane crash	
6	1992	Stolt Spur fire	Ship fire	
5	1969	1969 flash floods	Flash floods	
4	2004	Nicoll Highway collapse	Highway collapse	A portion of the Nicoll Highway caved in to a tunnel which was under construction, killing four workers.
4	1961	Bukit Ho Swee Fire	Fire	A fire broke out in a squatter camp killing four.
3	2000	Hand Foot Mouth disease outbreak	Epidemic	
3	1992	Ginza Plaza incident	Gas explosion	
2	2016	Pasir Ris rail accident	Rail accident	
2	1912	HMS Waterwitch (1892)	Ship collision	Two people drowned when the HMS Waterwitch collided with another ship in Singapore Harbour.
2	2004	Fusionopolis collapse	Building collapse	

== See also ==
- History of Singapore
