= Spyros disaster =

1978 industrial explosion in Singapore

- Date: 6 October 1978
- Time: 2.15 pm (UTC+08:00)
- Venue: Spyros
- Location: Jurong Shipyard, Singapore; 1.2800°N 103.6483°E
- Type: explosion
- Deaths: 76
- Injuries: 69

The Spyros disaster was a major industrial disaster that occurred in Singapore on 12 October 1978, where the Greek tanker Spyros exploded at Jurong Shipyard, killing 76 people and injuring 69 others. It remains the worst accident, in terms of lives lost, in Singapore's post-war history. It is also Singapore's worst industrial accident.

== Background ==
The Spyros was owned by Ulysses Tanker Corporation of Liberia and operated by International Operations, SA. The Liberian-registered vessel was built by Mitsubishi Heavy Industries of Japan in 1964 and was a steam turbine-driven tanker of 64,081 tons deadweight.

On 6 October 1978, the Spyros arrived in Singapore for a full special survey and general repairs at Jurong Shipyard. One of the items for repair was the replacement of the missing cover for the drip tray of the vent pipe leading from the aft starboard fuel oil tank.

== Explosion ==
At around 2:15 p.m., Spyros exploded. The explosion occurred as about 150 workers returned to the engine and boiler rooms of the vessel after their lunch break for repair and cleaning work. A number of the ship's 32 crew were also on board.

The blast flung debris from the 35,600-tonne vessel as far as 100 metres (328 ft) away and started a flash fire that prevented dockside workers from rescuing those trapped inside the ship.

== Aftermath ==
=== Rescue works ===
Minutes after the accident, an extensive rescue operation swung into action, involving the police, military and medical services. All hospitals were alerted to be on stand-by for casualties.

Rescue workers went into the ship's engine and boiler rooms to search for missing workers. Eight fire engines and ambulances rushed to the scene and after the fire was doused, more rescue workers poured into the ship to help the injured and remove the dead. The injured were ferried to hospital in ambulances and helicopters.

The general public responded with hundreds of people donating blood to victims.

=== Casualties ===
The wounded were ferried by ambulance and helicopter to Alexandra Hospital and Singapore General Hospital. Most of those hospitalised suffered serious burns, with their conditions described as critical. Others, including four firemen, were treated for inhalation of toxic gas and shock.

57 workers died on the day of the accident while 19 died due to their injuries in hospitals. Of the 76 deaths, 70 were male, six were female. 69 other workers were injured.

== Causes of accident ==
An inquiry found that safety practices were ignored when repairs were carried out on the vessel. Sparks from the cutting torch used during repairs caused a fire, which ignited an explosive vapour mixture within the aft starboard bunker (fuel) tank of the vessel. The fuel tank had been contaminated by crude oil. The explosion ruptured the common bulkhead between the tank and the engine room, releasing the burning oil into the engine room and setting it on fire, killing the workers there instantly.

== Impact ==
After the accident, greater safety consciousness in the shipbuilding and repairing industry was enforced.

== See also ==
- Collapse of the Hotel New World
