= Paya Lebar Methodist Girls' School =

Paya Lebar Methodist Girls' School (Singapore) is split into two sections (the primary school and the secondary school). Click on the following links for information about each of the two schools:

- Paya Lebar Methodist Girls' School (Secondary)
- Paya Lebar Methodist Girls' School (Primary)
