= Chia Yong Yong =

Singaporean lawyera and disability advocate

Chia Yong Yong (Chinese: 谢邕邕; pinyin: Xiè Yōngyōng; born 1962) is a Singaporean lawyer, disability advocate and a former Nominated Member of Parliament (NMP) of Singapore from August 2014 to September 2018.

== Education ==
Chia was educated in Paya Lebar Methodist Girls' School between 1969 and 1978 and later attended Catholic Junior College from 1979 to 1980. Following her A-Levels, she completed a Bachelor of Laws degree with Honours at the National University of Singapore in 1985, and was admitted to the Singapore Bar as an advocate and solicitor in 1986.

== Career ==
=== Legal career ===
Chia is a corporate lawyer in Singapore. In 2017, she started her own law firm, Chia Yong Yong Law Corporation. In media interviews, Chia expressed her passion for her work and overcoming challenges to conclude business deals.

Chia actively gives talks on commercial law issues, and is also a member of the Council of the Law Society's panel of approved Mediators and Investigative Tribunal.

==== Civil career ====
Chia was a member of the steering committee of Our Singapore Conversation in 2013, a steering committee member and work group member of the Committee on the Future Economy, steering committee member of the Third Enabling Masterplan.

In August 2014, Chia was appointed to be a NMP in the Parliament of Singapore. She is the first wheelchair user who has a seat in Singapore Parliament. In Parliament, Chia has spoken frequently on issues concerning disability welfare, including the MediShield Life Scheme Bill and on the proposed changes to the CPF scheme during the Budget 2015 Debate.

In June 2015, Chia was involved as a member of the Singapore Government's delegation to the United Nations Convention on the Rights of Persons with Disabilities Conference of the State Parties, serving as speaker at the United Nations Department of Economic and Social Affairs (UNDESA) Forum on Disability and Development, jointly organised by the UNDESA and the Republic of Singapore, and as moderator at the forum "Women with Disabilities", organised by the Republic of Korea.

Chia was reappointed for a second term in March 2016. She was a member of the Parliamentary Select Committee on Deliberate Online Falsehoods in 2018.

== Community work ==
Chia had served as a member of the Prisons Welfare Committee from 1986 to 1987.

Chia has served since 1995 as the legal advisor and company secretary of Very Special Arts Ltd, a charity organisation launched in September 1993 to provide persons with disabilities with opportunities to access the arts for rehabilitation and social integration.

Chia has been President of SPD, a society serving people with physical disabilities, since 2008.

She has been board member of SG Enable since 2014, and was also a member of the REACH Supervisory Panel from 2012 to 2016, and member of National Council of Social Service's Advocacy and Research Advisory Panel for one term.

=== Religious activity ===
Chia is a member of the Zion Bible-Presbyterian Church and formerly sat on its Board of Deacons between April 2007 and 2010. She was then on the board of deacons for Zion Bishan Bible-Presbyterian Church from 2010 till 2013.

== Personal life ==
Chia was diagnosed with peroneal muscular atrophy when she was 15. She gradually had to depend on crutches, and later wheelchairs, as her muscle tissue progressively weakened. She has not been able to stand for 20 years and her hands have grown limp.

For her work, Chia uses dictation software or dictates notes to her personal assistant.

== Achievements ==
In recognition of her dedication and continued efforts in the public and social services sectors, Chia was awarded the President's Social Service Award (Individual Category) in 2011, and the Pingat Bakti Masyarakat (Public Service Medal) in 2013.

In 2018, she was awarded the Bintang Bakti Masyarakat (Public Service Star).
