= 1957 Singapore de Havilland Venom crash =

Airplane crash

1957 Singapore airplane crash
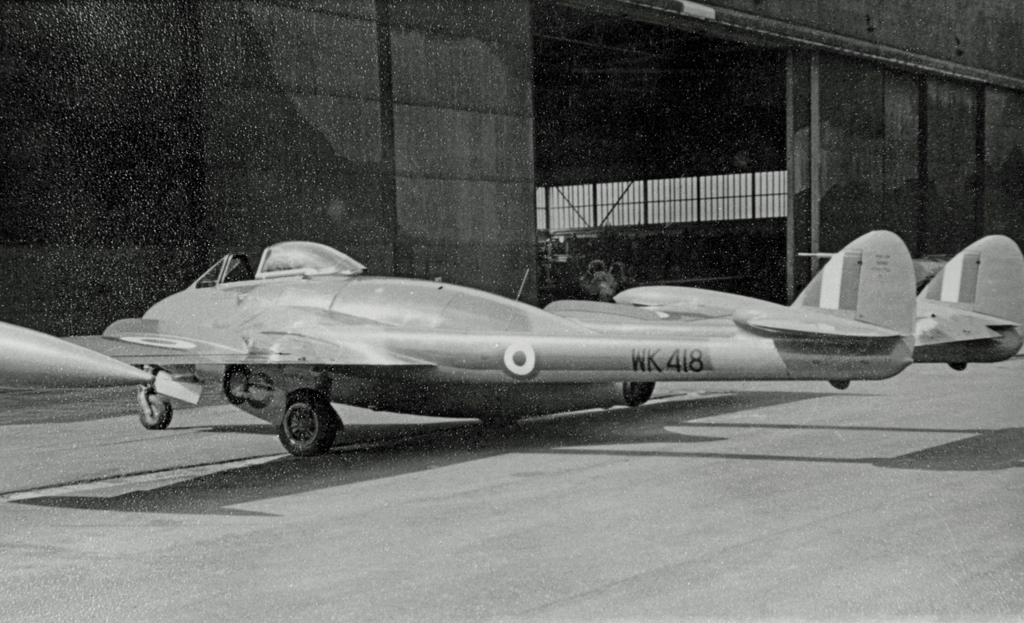
- A similar DH.112 Venom FB as in the crash, at Manchester Ringway Airport in 1954

Accident
- Date: 8 July 1957
- Summary: Crashed into a housing block killing the pilot and 5 others. In the aftermath also a fireman died.
- Site: Singapore

Aircraft
- Aircraft type: de Havilland DH.112 Venom FB.MK 1
- Operator: 60 Squadron RAF
- Registration: WK471
- Flight origin: Tengah Air Base
- Crew: 1
- Fatalities: 6 Crash site: 4 (pilot + 3 on the ground); Rescue operation: 2
- Injuries: Crash site: 10; Rescue operation: 9

On 8 July 1957, a de Havilland Venom operated by the 60 Squadron Royal Air Force crashed after departure from Tengah Air Base into a building block and exploded. During the crash, four people died including the pilot. Two more people died during the rescue operation. Nineteen people were injured.

== Crash ==
On 8 July 1957, a de Havilland DH.112 Venom FB.MK 1 operated by the 60 Squadron Royal Air Force on a training flight, crashed after departure from Tengah Air Base. The airplane stalled on take-off. After hitting with a wing the ground, the jet crashed into a two-storey housing block. The jet exploded and set the housing block on fire. The pilot of the airplane died. On the ground, two women and a fifteen-year-old child who lived in the housing block died. Ten people were injured.

== Aftermath ==
A fire truck that was on its way to the crash site had a traffic accident. In this accident, a firefighter and a bystander were killed after colliding with a truck about one mile from the Air Base. Due to this incident, nine people were injured including seven firefighters.
