= Paya Lebar Methodist Girls' School (Secondary) =

- 巴耶利峇美以美女中学; Sekolah Perempuan Paya Lebar Methodist

Location
- 296 Lorong Ah Soo, 536742; Singapore; 1.3508°N 103.8855°E

Information
- Type: Government-Aided; Autonomous
- Motto: Look Up, Lift Up
- Religious affiliation: Methodist
- Established: 1916; 110 years ago
- Session: Single (Day)
- School code: 7026
- Principal: Ms Amy Ng
- Age: 13 to 17
- Enrolment: approx. 2,000 per sch
- Colour: Blue Gold
- Affiliation: Anglo-Chinese Junior College
- Website: plmgss.moe.edu.sg

Paya Lebar Methodist Girls' School (PLMGS) is located in Hougang, Singapore. Running on a single-session, the school caters to students from Primary 1 to 6 and Secondary 1 to 4/5 in the Express, Normal Academic and Normal Technical streams in Paya Lebar Methodist Girls’ School (Primary) and Paya Lebar Methodist Girls’ School (Secondary).

The primary and secondary schools has less than 100 students. Since 1995, PLMGS(Sec) and (Pri) has been offering Higher Mother Tongue languages and specialised deep-learning programmes in Maths, Science and Aesthetics.

== History ==
=== Paya Lebar English School & Methodist English Preparatory School (1916-1960) ===
On 31 October 1916, the Secretary of the Methodist Episcopal Building and Location Board purchased a piece of land with an area of 93,000 sq ft (8,600 m^{2}) on Boundary Road to build a school. The school was a branch of the Anglo-Chinese school and was known as Paya Lebar English School. Paya Lebar English School started functioning as an elementary school in 1917, with three staff and a total pupil enrolment of 24 boys, where the first headmaster was Robert Hanam who served the school until 1923. However, in 1918, the school started to take in girls. After Hanam stepped down from his position of headmaster, Smith took over as headmaster until 1928, where the school closed for 2 years to start a new school - Methodist English Preparatory School. The brand new school moved from their old school in Boundary Road to Upper Serangoon Road, a two-storey shop house beside Kampong Sireh. Not only that, but the school also had a new headmaster, Daniel Sundram until 1935. Shortly after that, in 1932, the school moved into a building of a new school and church building at Boundary road yet again.

In 1935, Chew Hock Hin became Principal until 1958. After World War II, she helped to reorganise and restart the school after the Japanese Occupation. The school had also started to work in 2 sessions - one in the morning, the other in the afternoon. The morning school, Paya Lebar Methodist Girls' School, which was attended by girls; and the afternoon school, Paya Lebar Methodist Boys' School, which was attended by boys. Once the two schools were established, Chew continued to be Principal of the Girls' Morning session until 1957, where Robert Eu took over while Elsie Hardy was the principal of the Boys' Morning session, up until 1957 where Gan Kee Tian took over.

In 1961, it had become a fully girls' school and was called Paya Lebar Methodist Girls' School, where Robert Eu was the principal.

=== Progress as Paya Lebar Methodist Girls' School (1961 till now) ===
In 1986, Paya Lebar MGS made its move from Boundary Road to the present campus along Lorong Ah Soo. The year also saw the creation of two schools, Paya Lebar Methodist Girls' School (Primary) and Paya Lebar Methodist Girls' School (Secondary).

In January 2005, PLMGS (Sec) moved out to a holding site when it started its redevelopment project under PRIME 6.

On 3 January 2007, it moved back to its upgraded premises at Lorong Ah Soo and the school was officially reopened by Minister Teo Chee Hean in October 2007.

As an autonomous school since 2002, PLMGS(Sec) has attained the School Distinction Award (2007), Best Practice Awards (BPA) for Staff Well-Being (2003, 2007 and 2012), Teaching and Learning (2007 and 2012) and Student All Round Development (2012) and the Outstanding Development Award (Character Development) (2009 and 2012). In the 2012 external validation exercise, the school was accorded the School Excellence Award, the pinnacle award in the MOE's Masterplan of Awards. The school has also achieved two SPRING Singapore Business Excellence awards, namely, the People Developer Award and the Singapore Quality Class.

In 2014, PLMGS (Pri) was awarded the School Distinction Award and obtained best practice awards for the areas of Teaching & Learning, Character and Citizenship Education, Student All-Round Development and Staff Well-Being and Development.

In strengthening the vibrant arts culture which is an identified niche area in PLMGS, PLMGS(Sec) together with PLMGS(Pri), have been the East Zone Centre of Excellence for Creative Arts (COE CA) since 2008. This has resulted in collaborative work with schools in the East Zone in developing arts education in schools which would impact the larger population of girls. In this aspect, PLMGS (Sec) has continually sought to further strengthen her niche in music and the performing arts and the school was conferred the National Arts Education (Blaze) Award (the pinnacle award) in 2011 for its efforts in this area. This award was renewed in 2015.

In 2016 the school celebrated its 100th anniversary.

== Affiliation ==
Paya Lebar Methodist Girls' School (Secondary) is affiliated to Paya Lebar Methodist Girls' School (Primary), giving students from the Primary section priority for admission if they obtain a minimum of 212 points, after sitting for the Primary School Leaving Examination. Students from other schools who wish to enter Paya Lebar Methodist Girls' School are subject to a higher cut-off point, which is determined by the quality of applicants' PSLE scores for that year.

PLMGS (Sec) is also religiously affiliated to the Methodist Church in Singapore and other Methodist Schools in Singapore including: Methodist Girls' School, Anglo-Chinese School, Fairfield Methodist Secondary School and Geylang Methodist Secondary School.

== Academic information ==
Being a non-special programme secondary school, Paya Lebar Methodist Girls' School (Sec) offers three academic streams, namely the four-year Express (G3) course, as well as the Normal Course, comprising Normal (Academic) (G2) and Normal (Technical) (G1) academic tracks.

=== O Level Express Course ===
The Express Course is a nationwide four-year programme that leads up to the Singapore-Cambridge GCE Ordinary Level examination.

==== Academic subjects ====
The examinable academic subjects for Singapore-Cambridge GCE Ordinary Level offered by Paya Lebar Methodist Girls' School (Secondary) for upper secondary level (via. streaming in secondary 2 level), as of 2017, are listed below.

Notes:

1. Subjects indicated with ' * ' are mandatory subjects.
2. All students in Singapore are required to undertake a Mother Tongue Language as an examinable subject, as indicated by ' ^ '.
3. "SPA" in Pure Science subjects refers to the incorporation of School-based Science Practical Assessment, which 20% of the subject result in the national examination are determined by school-based practical examinations, supervised by the Singapore Examinations and Assessment Board. The SPA Assessment has been replaced by one Practical Assessment in the 2018 O Levels.

Sciences	Language & Humanities	Arts & Aesthetics
Additional Mathematics*; Mathematics*; Physics (SPA); Chemistry (SPA)*; Biology (SPA); Science (Combined)	English Language*; English Literature; Mother Tongue Language* ^; Higher Mother Tongue Language; Geography; History; Combined Humanities (Social Studies & another Humanities subject at elective level)*	Art; Design & Technology; Food & Nutrition; Music

=== Normal Course ===
The Normal Course is a nationwide 4-year programme leading to the Singapore-Cambridge GCE Normal Level examination, which runs either the Normal (Academic) curriculum or Normal (Technical) curriculum, abbreviated as N(A) and N(T) respectively.

==== Normal (Academic) Course ====
In the Normal (Academic) course, students offer 5-8 subjects in the Singapore-Cambridge GCE Normal Level examination. Compulsory subjects include:

- English Language
- Mother Tongue Language
- Mathematics
- Combined Humanities

A 5th year leading to the Singapore-Cambridge GCE Ordinary Level examination is available to N(A) students who perform well in their Singapore-Cambridge GCE Normal Level examination. Students can move from one course to another based on their performance and the assessment of the school principal and teachers.

==== Normal (Technical) Course ====
The Normal (Technical) course prepares students for a technical-vocational education at the Institute of Technical Education. Students will offer 5-7 subjects in the Singapore-Cambridge GCE Normal Level examination.

The curriculum is tailored towards strengthening students’ proficiency in English and Mathematics. Students take English Language, Mathematics, Basic Mother Tongue and Computer Applications as compulsory subjects.

== Co-curricular activities ==
The CCA can be in the field of performing arts, sports, uniform group or a club/society. Girls with special aptitude are given opportunities to participate in enrichment and competitions to challenge the status quo to stretch their learning.

Paya Lebar Methodist Girls’ School (Pri & Sec) were appointed as the East Zone Centre of Excellence for the Creative Arts (COECA) in 2008. COECA@PL organises and spearheads performing arts programmes impacting staff and pupils in the East Zone schools. In 2010, the former COEs for Music (Pasir Ris Crest Secondary School) and for Art (Siglap Secondary School) joined the COECA as its Music and Art Satellites respectively. In 2012, Haig Girls’ School was appointed as COECA@Haig with the specific focus on arts education.

PLMGS (Sec) received the BLAZE award in the 2015 National Arts Education Award.

=== CCAs Offered ===
PLMGS (Sec) has 10 performing arts groups, namely: Band, Choir, Harp Ensemble, Chinese Drama, Debate, Dance, English Drama, Guitar, Guzheng Ensemble and Handbell Ensemble. All the performing arts groups have achieved at least a silver in the past few Singapore Youth Festival Central Judging Competitions. With sustained achievement in the Aesthetics, the school has been selected to be the East Zone's Centre of Excellence (COE) for the Performing Arts.

The school has 3 Uniform Groups (UGs) - The Girls' Brigade, the National Police Cadet Corps and the St John's Brigade. All the UGs develop programs to engage the girls and to help them build character and leadership.

The school has Clubs and Societies which includes Infocomm Technology (Media Production) and English language, Drama and Debating.

The school has 7 Sports teams that participates actively in the annual National Schools Games which include Badminton, Table Tennis, Swimming, Track & Field, Volleyball, Rhythmic Gymnastics and Netball.

== Notable alumni ==
- E.W. Barker - former Minister for Law
- Lim Siong Guan - Group President of the Government of Singapore Investment Corporation
- Julie Tan - Actress
- Chia Yong Yong - Singaporean lawyer, disability advocate and a Nominated Member of Parliament of Singapore
