= Tang I-Fang =

Chinese economist (1924–2013)

Tang I-Fang 唐義方 DUBC
- Born: September 16, 1924; Tongcheng County, Anhui Province, Republic of China
- Died: September 26, 2013 (aged 89); Singapore
- Occupations: Economist, Businessman

Tang I-Fang DUBC (simplified Chinese: 唐义方; traditional Chinese: 唐義方, September 16, 1924 – September 26, 2013) was a China-born Singaporean veteran public servant, economic strategist for developing countries and businessman.

== Education and career ==
Tang graduated from National Central University (Nanjing University), Chongqing, China and earned a B.Sc. in mechanical engineering in 1944. During the Second World War, Tang worked as a translator for the U.S. Army. Subsequently, the U.S. military sent him to the U.S. for officer's training and to work on translating training manuals. After the war, Tang attended Harvard Business School and he graduated in 1948 with an MBA. Following graduation, Tang joined the United Nations under the United Nations Industrial Study and Advisory Group for Asia and the Far East (ECAFE). He was assigned to various developing nations (Somalia, Thailand, Philippines and Myanmar) to give advice on their economic development.

Tang's involvement with Singapore began in 1959 when he arrived as deputy leader of a United Nations delegation led by Dr. Albert Winsemius, a renowned expert in development economics. At the invitation of the Singapore government, Tang became the Chairman of the Singapore Economic Development Board (EDB) which was instrumental in transforming Singapore into a key regional and global hub for companies to do business. Singapore's Prime Minister, Lee Hsien Loong, described Tang as a "sharp, shrewd and a good negotiator" who "enabled the EDB to attract leading MNCs (multinational corporations) and investors from around the world."

Lee credits Tang with devising the initial plans for a regional industrial estate in Singapore, now known as Jurong Town Corporation (JTC), but a serious economic recession forced the government to postpone construction. Lee added "As it turned out, Mr. Tang was absolutely right about the strategic direction, but was ahead of his time. Our current efforts to transform Jurong into the Jurong Lake District, including regional offices and an integrated work-live-play environment, reflect many of his original ideas."

Lee highlighted Tang's vision to expand JTC's role from infrastructure developer to a catalyst for new industries. Lee cited Tang as being "instrumental" in establishing Singapore's first Science Park and developing the Southern Island into a petrochemical hub.

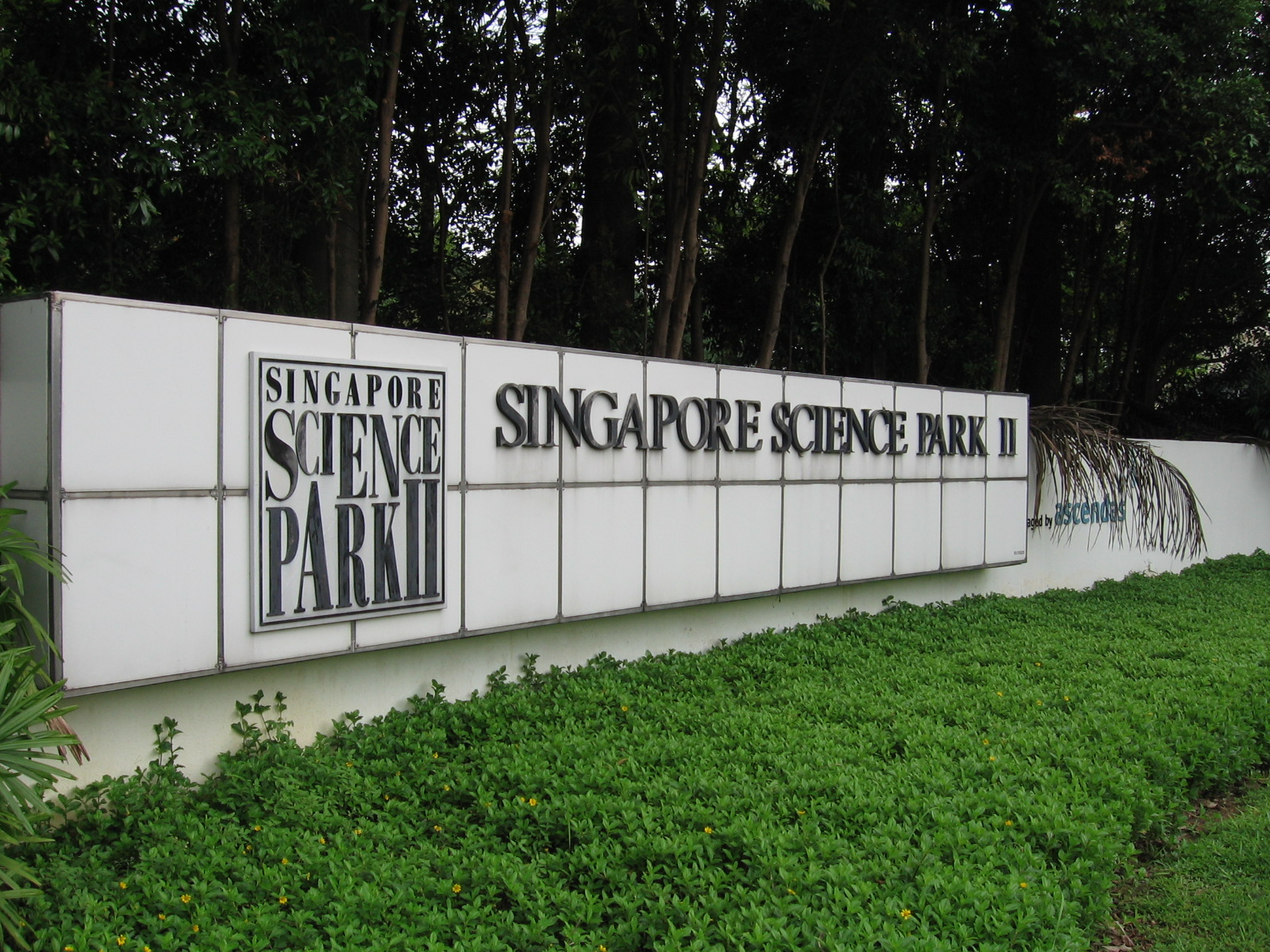
Mr. Tang helped establish Singapore's first Science Park

Tang's vision for the Republic's Science Park was to develop a research center that would cater to special industries and companies that were in the forefront of promoting research and high technology industries. His goal was to bring Singapore into a new stage of industrial development. Tang also recognized the importance of reclaiming land to expand the island. Under his direction, JTC reclaimed 650 hectares of land that now houses Tuas Biomedical Park.

Lee stated that Tang's passion for Singapore was "beyond doubt, and that Singapore was lucky to have had Mr. Tang."

From 1960 to 1963, Tang was chief of the United Nations Industrial Study and Advisory Group for Asia and the Far East (ECAFE) which assisted in designing and implementing industrialization programs for developing countries. Tang led the ECAFE industrial missions to India, the Philippines, Taiwan, Thailand and Myanmar. From 1963 to 1967, he became a consultant for the United Nations Development Programme (UNDP) and was chief consultant for the United Nations Industrial Conference for Asia (1963-1972).

In the early 1960s, Tang I-Fang was a member of the UNDP Mission which played a key role in spearheading Singapore's economic development programs. He was chairman of the Economic Development Board of Singapore (EDB) from 1968 to 1972 and served as chairman of the Jurong Town Corporation (JTC) which authorized the development of industrial parks and the industrial port in Singapore from 1979 to 1986. Tang continued as a leading member of the EDB, serving as deputy chairman and chairman of the executive committee of EDB until 1986. In 1985, Tang was appointed chairman of Sub-Committee on Service Sector, Economic Committee by the Singapore government. In recognition of the critical role he played in furthering these development programs, the largest Singapore-based, Chinese language newspaper, Lian He Zao Bao, described Tang I-Fang as a "major contributor to Singapore's industrialization". [2] In 1972, the Singapore Government awarded him the Distinguished Public Services Award. For his contribution to the economic development of developing countries, he was awarded the Distinguished Services Award by the American-Chinese Institute of Engineers, New York, (1978) and in 1989, Tang was voted Singapore Businessman of the Year.

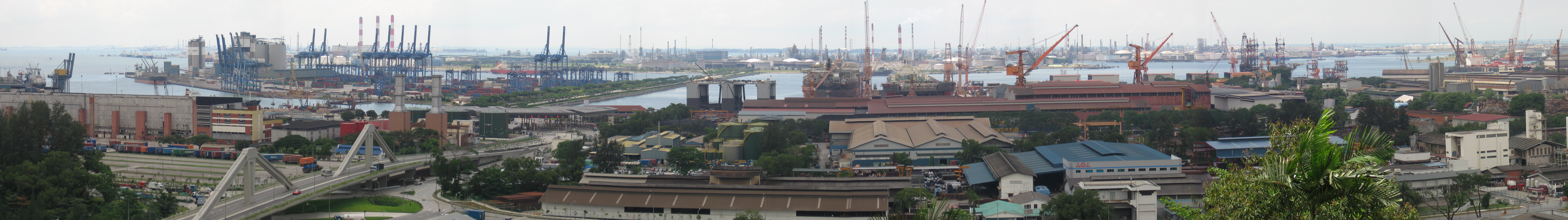
Jurong Industrial Estate with Jurong Island in the background, photographed in November 2006

In 1978, Tang I-Fang was appointed director and subsequently served as chairman of WBL Corporation Limited (formerly Wearnes) from 1983 until his retirement in May 2006. Under Tang's direction, WBL was successfully transformed from a local automotive distributor into a high-tech and diversified multinational group. He was described as a "visionary strategist, charismatic leader, trouble shooter and corporate treasure." In its 1989 centennial edition, the Wall Street Journal listed 66 companies worldwide, including WBL, as the "select few poised to lead business into the 1990s". WBL was the only company in this list from the Southeast Asian region. Commenting on Tang's corporate development strategy, the Wall Street Journal's citation read: "WBL is among those that could make our world different tomorrow. ... that will lead advances in technology, find new ways to make and market products and services and elevate the science of management to an art".

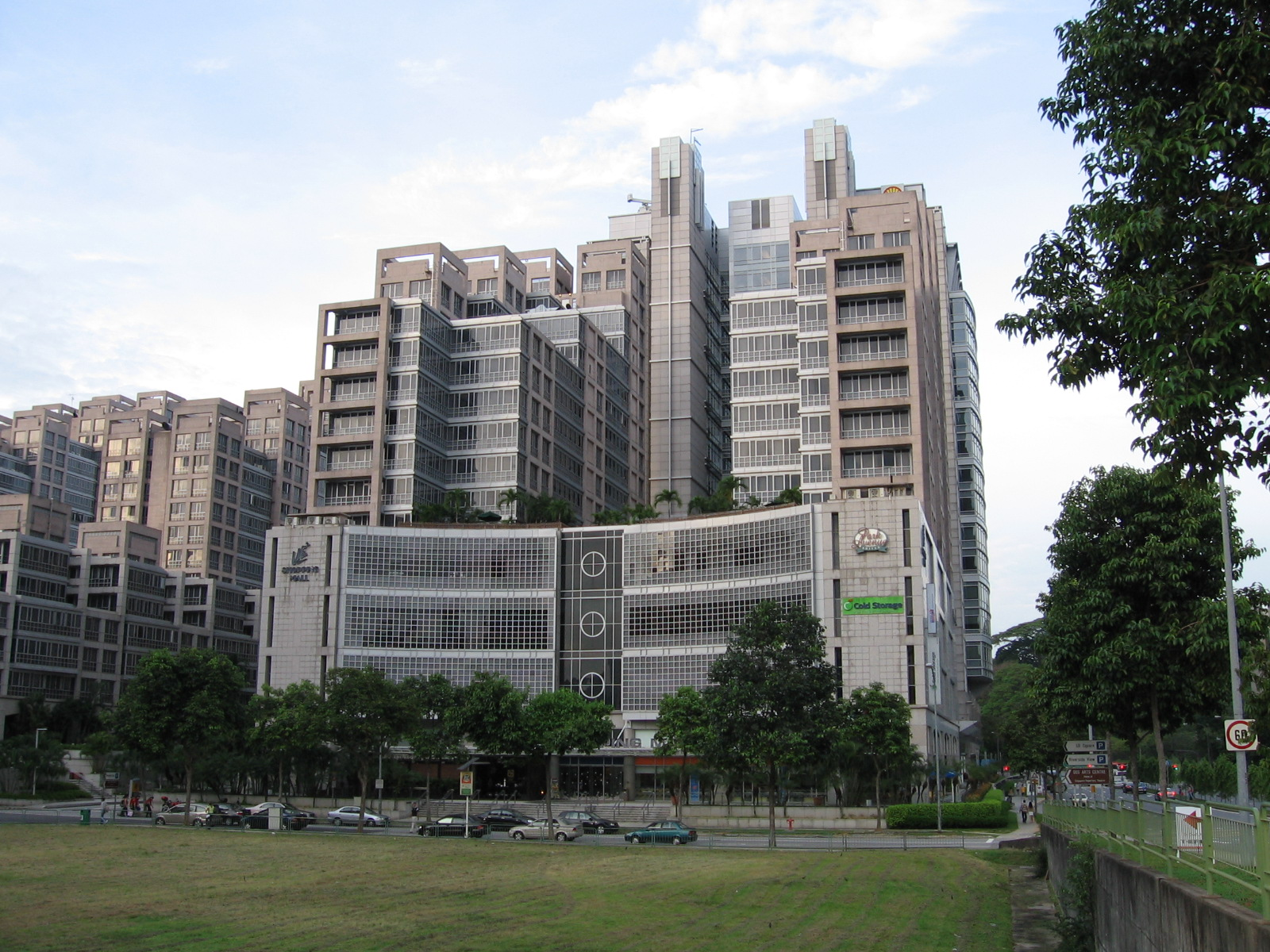
Tang I-Fang's leadership was instrumental in the construction of United Engineers Square.

As a director and chairman of United Engineers (UE) from 1987 to 2005, Tang's "visionary leadership" had "over the years enabled the group to grow tremendously ... in particular, he sowed the seeds for the group's growing business presence in China and was also instrumental in the development of the group's flagship building UE Square." noted UE's chairman, Mr. Tan Ngiap Joo.

Recognizing China's potential as an emerging economic power, Tang spearheaded WBL and UE's foray into China in 1991 and invested in companies that deal in high-tech, bio-tech, agro-tech, infrastructure construction and housing developments. Among these companies, Huaxin International Development Company established a reputation in China as a quality housing developer, and won more than 40 national, provincial and city government awards for its high standards of design, construction and property management. In a joint venture in 2000 with the Government of Singapore Investment Corporation and Singapore Power Ltd, UE completed the construction of a power plant in Hefei which was one of the major suppliers of electricity for Anhui Province and eastern China.

Tang's other private sector directorships included, The Straits Trading Company Ltd (director 1981-2001; deputy chairman 1989-2007 and chairman from August to December 2007). He was also a founding board member of Singapore Press Holdings Limited (1984–2004) and a director of Times Publishing Ltd. (1988–2001). In the finance sector, he was deputy chairman of Dresdner Bank (SEA) Ltd (1975–1990) and a director of Overseas-Chinese Banking Corporation Ltd (OCBC) (1990–2000).

During the 1960s, Tang I-Fang participated in the formulation of development programs for several territories and countries in Asia. In the 1970s the Government of Jordan contracted with Tang to design the kingdom's industrial estates and advise the nation's leaders on the development of an industrial port. In the early 1980s, Tang was involved in the preparation of Shenzhen city's development plan. In 1990, as chief of UNDP Economic Mission to Yingkou city, China, he assisted in the preparation of Yingkou city Economic Development Plan and paved the way for the establishment of the National Yingkou Economic and Development Zone. At the invitation of the UNDP and the World Bank, Tang took part as a consultant in the International Workshop on the Economic Development of Shanghai Pudong in 1991. In 1992, he was a keynote speaker at the Senior Policy Seminar on Macroeconomic Management of Reform for Vietnam and the consultant for the UNDP Workshop on Guangdong's 20 year Economic and Social Development Plan.

In the roles of director on the board of the Lee Kuan Yew Exchange Fellowship and pro-chancellor of Nanyang Technological University Tang became an active advocate in the promotion of intellectual exchange and education. He was also an advisory professor of Peking University and honorary professor of Central China University of Science and Technology. Under Tang's direction, WBL's subsidiary in Shenyang, China, established the Huaxin International School (1994), which became a model school in North East China.

== Personal life ==
Tang I-Fang was born in Tongcheng County of Anhui Province in China. His father, Tang Zhe Ming (1908-1978), was the Major General, Principal of the Military School, and Chief of Staff of the Central Command, Nanjing Military School. His mother was Sun Zhen Jing (1898-1973). In 1948, he married Dolly Kolling Wong and they had four children, Brian, Lily, David and Maryann.

Tang adopted Singapore as his home and became a naturalized citizen in 1972.

== Awards and honors ==
- In 1972, the Singapore Government awarded Tang the Distinguished Service Order.
- In 1978, the American-Chinese Institute of Engineers, New York conferred their Distinguished Services Award.
- In 1989, Tang was awarded Singapore Businessman of the Year.

== Death ==
Tang died on September 26, 2013. Prime Minister Lee Hsien Loong sent a letter of condolence to Tang's wife.
