= Veredus Laboratories =

Singaporean medical device company

- Founded: 2003
- Founder: Rosemary Tan
- Headquarters: Singapore
- Key people: Mamoru Takemura (CEO)
- Parent: Sekisui Chemical
- Website: vereduslabs.com

Veredus Laboratories is a medical device company in Singapore specializing in developing portable diagnostic tool kits.

Veredus Laboratories was founded in 2003 by Dr. Rosemary Tan. The company released its first product in 2006.

In July 2005, Veredus Laboratories launched a DNA- and RNA-based diagnostic kits for dengue, avian influenza and malaria. The kit is based on technologies licensed from A*STAR and the National University of Singapore.

In January 2006, Veredus Laboratories and STMicroelectronics announced a joint effort in the development of a rapid diagnostic kit for avian influenza and other influenza viruses which could produces a result within an hour, based on Lab-on-a-chip (LOC) technology. In July 2006, Veredus Laboratories set up an on-board avian influenza testing laboratory on USS Blue Ridge, the flagship of the United States 7th Fleet, and on the aircraft carrier USS Kitty Hawk.

Veredus Laboratories released VereTrop in April 2013, a biochip that can diagnose 13 different varieties of tropical diseases from a single blood sample.

A year later in May 2014, the company released VereMERS, a lab-on-a-chip application capable of detecting the coronavirus that causes Middle East Respiratory Syndrome.

In April 2018, Veredus Laboratories was acquired by Sekisui Chemical Co.
