= 2005 dengue outbreak in Singapore =

Disease outbreak in Singapore

- Disease: Dengue fever
- Pathogen: Dengue virus
- Location: Singapore
- Date: 2005
- Confirmed cases: 14,006
- Severe cases: 381
- Deaths: 27
- Fatality rate: 0.19%

Government website
- NEA Dengue Cases

In the 2005 dengue outbreak in Singapore, a significant rise in the number of dengue fever cases was reported in Singapore, becoming the country's worst health crisis since the 2003 SARS epidemic. In October 2005, there were signs that the dengue fever outbreak had peaked, as the number of weekly cases had declined and the outbreak of this infectious disease declined by the end of 2005.

== Status of outbreak ==
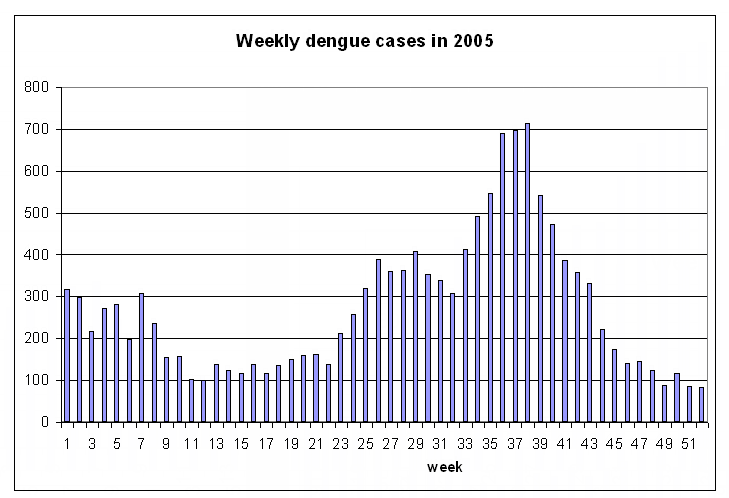
The number of dengue fever cases per week in 2005. Between 18 June and 29 October, the number of weekly dengue fever cases exceeded the epidemic threshold of 237.

Status (as of 31 December 2005)
Number of cases	14,209
Number of deaths	27

In 2005 there were a total of 14,209 dengue fever cases and 27 people died, a record death toll that would not be surpassed until 2020. The outbreak peaked in the months of September and October, when it caused hospitals to cancel some elective surgery due to the need to allocate more beds for dengue patients.

Singapore's health-care system is helping to maintain a low fatality rate at 0.2% (2005), which is lower than Southeast Asia's regional average of 0.8% in 2004, according to the World Health Organization.

The National Environment Agency (NEA) said that the dengue fever problem may be worsening because of higher temperatures and changes in viral strains. The mean temperature has risen to 28.2 °C (82.8 °F) from 27.8 °C in 2003.

In the second week of September, more than 100 new cases were reported daily and many were admitted to public hospitals.

Health Minister Khaw Boon Wan said that one of the concerns is that more Singaporeans are infected with Dengue Type 3, which is a new strain of the dengue virus.

Some experts, such as Dr Paul Reiter, Professor of Entomology at the Pasteur Institute in France, suggested that Singapore's success in suppressing the dengue has partly contributed to this year sudden increase in dengue cases. The population born over the last two decades has a low herd immunity and therefore more susceptible to the virus.

In January 2006, Environment and Water Resources Minister Yaacob Ibrahim declared the dengue outbreak is under control with average 84 cases weekly compared to a peak of more than 700.

== Inter-ministerial and inter-agency committees ==
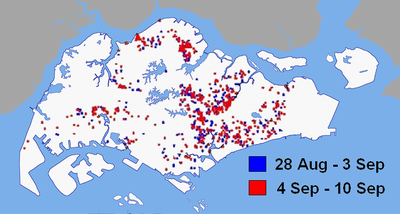
Dengue hotspots: geographical distribution of dengue cases.

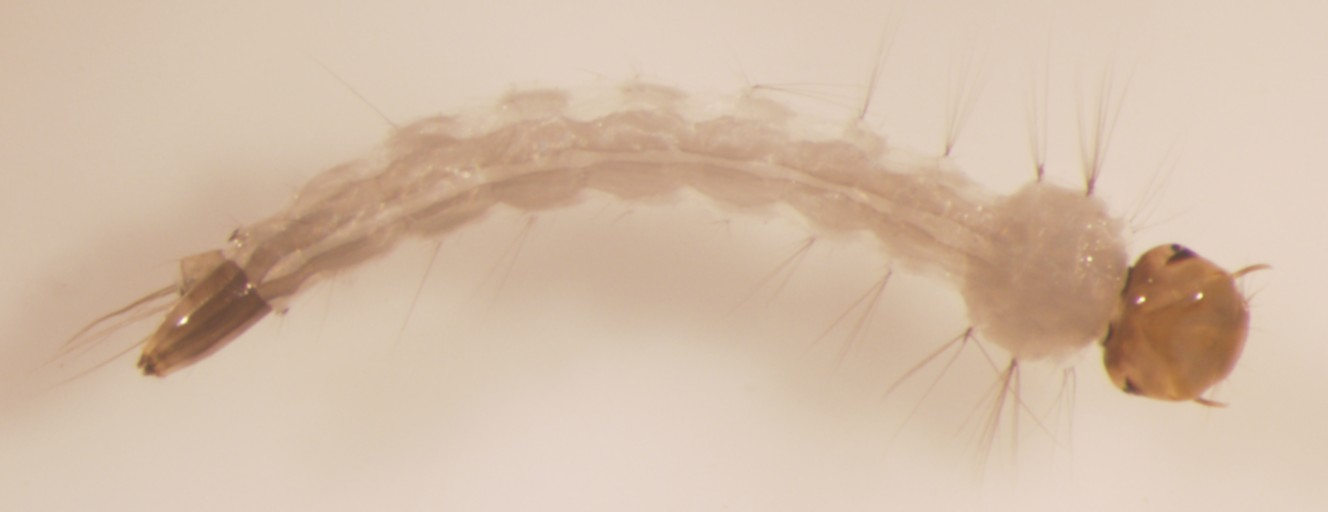
Larva of Aedes aegypti mosquito, the primary vector for dengue.

In September, an inter-ministerial committee headed by Minister for the Environment and Water Resources, Yaacob Ibrahim, was formed to tackle the dengue outbreak. Yaacob Ibrahim delivered a ministerial statement on the issue in the parliament on 19 September.

An inter-agency Dengue Coordination Committee and a community-centred Dengue Watch Committee have also been established. The Dengue Coordination Committee involves the permanent secretaries of the Environment, Health, and National Development ministries, and chief executive officers of key government statutory boards, and it aims to ensure that the various policy initiatives by the various ministries are well-coordinated. Land Transport Authority (LTA) would make sure that bus-stops, Mass Rapid Transit stations, construction sites are free of mosquito breeding. Singapore Land Authority (SLA) were also stepping up their checks on vacant state land and properties, while the Housing and Development Board (HDB) and town councils are stepping up the cleaning of common areas.

The Dengue Watch Committee is chaired by Khoo Tsai Kee who is the Senior Parliamentary Secretary for the Environment and Water Resources. He will co-ordinate with the five mayors in Singapore to reach out to the 84 advisers and the town councils, to oversee dengue prevention measures at the community level.

A panel of experts had also been set up to advise the government on anti-dengue measures. The panel is chaired by Dr Chee Yam Cheng, Clinical Professor and Assistant chief executive officer of National Healthcare Group.

== Preventive measures ==
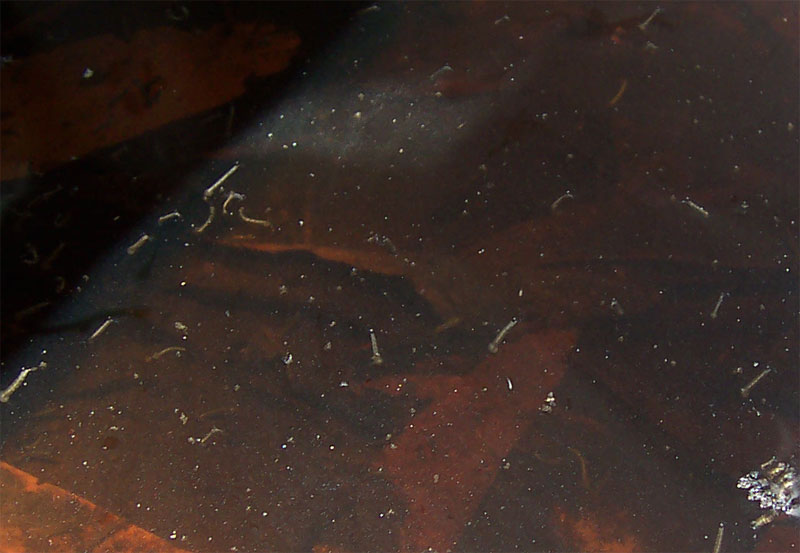
Larvae in stagnant water

Singapore launched a number of measures to contain the dengue outbreak, including public awareness campaigns and regular fogging with insecticides. 4,200 volunteers, 970 environmental control officers hired by construction sites, 350 so-called "mozzie busters" made up of girl guides and scouts, have participated in the preventive efforts.

The Ministry of Health stepped up its monitoring of common mosquito breeding sites and launched an online map listing "hotspots" for the insects. Residents who allow mosquitoes to breed in their homes can be fined between S$100 to S$200, and heavier penalties may be issued for construction sites found with standing water. The number of officers conducting such checks have tripled since the start of the year to 360, and may increase to 510 by December.

The National Environment Agency has allocated an additional S$7.5 million on top of its existing S$2.5 million budget to clear drains of stagnant water where mosquitoes breed. Singapore Land Authority has also stepped up its checks on vacant state properties.

On 10 September, National Environment Agency started collecting blood samples from residents of Sims Avenue, a dengue hotspot, to help track the infection. The residents were asked to provide voluntarily 5 millilitres of blood sample and a swab of saliva for the study. The samples were to be analysed for antibodies against dengue infection in the last 2 months.

The National Parks Board (NParks) is considering removing broad-leafed plants which may breed mosquitoes. These plants like palm trees or any plants with axils capable of trapping water, are potential breeding sites. Some town councils had removed some or all palm trees in their jurisdictions. Additional trimming of palm trees had been done by NParks to reduce potential breeding sites. As holes in tree trunks are also a concern, NParks had regularly filling these holes with sands. NParks has engaged 16 pest companies to prevent mosquito breeding in the parks it manages. Due to the dengue threat, some schools are cancelling excursions to the parks.

By end of October, town councils are to employ dedicated pest control officers and engage in more frequent drain cleanings.

=== Community response ===
Health Minister Khaw Boon Wan urged the public to help in the fight against the disease. As households are common breeding grounds for mosquitos and are less accessible for fogging, residents can help by checking for stagnant water in their households and neighbourhood and ensuring no blockage of drains. Due to the short life cycle of Aedes aegypti mosquitos (7 to 10 days), frequent checks are necessary to eradicate dengue. These checks only take several minutes and could potentially save lives.

Dr Kevin Palmer, World Health Organization's regional adviser for mosquito-borne diseases, said that it is important for ordinary residents to play their part. He added that fogging alone was not effective as winds could blow the insecticide away. Yaacob Ibrahim also said that fogging only kills adult mosquitoes, but not the larva and therefore less effective compared to removing breeding sites.

Singapore residents are also arming themselves with anti-mosquito products including insecticides, repellents and electronic mosquito traps. For repellents, experts are recommending those with an active ingredients, such as DEET which provide more effective and lasting protection.

As a preventive measure, some residents bought a perennial grass plant, Citronella, and placing it at their home to repel mosquitos. The plant gives off a strong lemon-like fragrance which supposedly repels mosquitoes.

To prevent the spread of the virus, those who are already infected with dengue are encouraged to use mosquito repellents, wear long-sleeved clothing and sleep under mosquito nets to prevent mosquitoes from biting them again and spreading the virus to others.

=== Weekend blitz ===
Minister for the Environment and Water Resources Yaacob Ibrahim informed Parliament that NEA officers with volunteers would conduct weekend blitz campaigns over six weeks, covering all estates, to destroy mosquito-breeding sites.

==== First blitz, 17–18 September ====
On the weekend of 17–18 September, more than 700 officers and volunteers launched a house-to-house campaign to remove breeding sites at four neighbourhoods, in what Minister Mah Bow Tan described as "sort of a carpet-combing exercise". The four neighbourhoods involved in the weekend blitz are Ang Mo Kio, Yishun, Hougang and Marsiling, which are among the worst affected regions.

In this "search-and-destroy" operation, mosquito-fighting "commandos" combed the streets, checked the drains, looked at the bins and the roof structures at all estates to seek and destroy breeding sites. They found 172 mosquito-breeding sites, mainly flower pot trays, water containers, litter in open area and tree holes.

==== Second blitz, 24–25 September ====
In the following weekend, the blitz was continued and covered five other areas such as Toa Payoh/Bishan, Tampines, Choa Chu Kang, Bedok and Boon Lay/Jurong, and 220 breeding sites were found and destroyed.

==== Third blitz, 1–2 October ====
More than one thousand volunteers were involved in this third blitz to cover areas including Kallang, West Coast and Jurong East. 187 breeding sites were found and removed.

== Treatment ==
In September, Singapore experienced a drastic rise of dengue cases. In the first week alone, 547 new cases were reported and many required hospital care. As the treatment lasts about 10 days, many hospitals across Singapore are experiencing shortage of hospitals beds. To cope with the strain, hospitals are postponing non-emergency operations to accommodate the dengue patients.

General practitioners and polyclinics are on high alert to check for cases of dengue and are ordering more patients to have their blood tested for suspected dengue. The test, which takes fifteen minutes, is based on platelet count; dengue sufferers have 100,000 or lower platelet count as compared to 140,000 to 400,000 of a healthy person. If a suspected dengue patient is diagnosed, the patient will be referred to a hospital for more accurate testing.

== Dengue diagnostic kits ==
In July 2005, a Singapore life science start-up company Veredus Laboratories launched a DNA- and RNA-based diagnostic kits for dengue, avian influenza and malaria. The kit is based on technologies licensed from A*STAR and the National University of Singapore.

Another Singapore company Attogenix Biosystems has also developed a biochip called AttoChip which has successfully undergone an independent clinical trial conducted by Tan Tock Seng Hospital and is 98 percent accurate. The AttoChip identifies genes, viruses and bacteria-causing diseases from a blood sample. It can detect the presence of the dengue virus within two to three days of the onset of the virus.

== See also ==
- Mosquito control
- 2006 dengue outbreak in Pakistan
- 2013 dengue outbreak in Singapore
