= Singapore Accountancy Commission =

Agency overview
- Formed: 1 April 2013; 13 years ago
- Dissolved: 1 April 2023; 3 years ago
- Jurisdiction: Government of Singapore
- Headquarters: 10 Anson Road, International Plaza #05-18, Singapore 079903
- Agency executives: Chaly Mah, Chairman; Evan Law, Chief Executive
- Parent agency: Ministry of Finance
- Website: www.sac.gov.sg
- Agency ID: T12GB0001B

The Singapore Accountancy Commission (SAC) was a statutory body under the Ministry of Finance of the Government of Singapore. Launched on 1 April 2013, the SAC works to advance Singapore’s accounting sector and provides for the registration of Chartered Accountants of Singapore.

== History ==
The SAC Bill was read the first time on 15 November 2012 and subsequently passed during the second and third reading by the Singapore Parliament on 14 January 2013. The formation of the SAC is one of the recommendations made in the Final Report by the committee to Develop the Accountancy Sector (CDAS) in 2010.

=== Committee to Develop the Accountancy Sector (CDAS) ===
The CDAS was formed by the Ministry of Finance in December 2008 to undertake a review of the Singapore accountancy sector and profession. The CDAS, chaired by Bobby Chin, chairman of the Singapore Totalisator Board and formerly managing partner of KPMG LLP Singapore, comprised members of the accounting profession, the business community, academia and the public sector. The CDAS Final Report contained 10 recommendations, which were accepted by the Ministry of Finance.

After the Final Report, the CDAS was dissolved and the Pro-Tem Singapore Accountancy Council (PSAC) was formed to implement the accepted recommendations.

=== Pro-Tem Singapore Accountancy Council (PSAC) ===
The Pro-Tem Singapore Accountancy Council was formed in September 2010. Bobby Chin was the first chairman of the PSAC. Under his leadership, the PSAC laid the groundwork which led to the development of the Singapore Qualification Programme (QP) and the Singapore CFO Institute. In October 2011, Michael Lim, chairman, Land Transport Authority, took over as chairman from Mr Bobby Chin.

== Initiatives ==
=== Chartered Accountants of Singapore and the Singapore CA Qualification ===
The Singapore CA Qualification (formerly known as Singapore Qualification Programme or Singapore QP) is an educational qualification required to be a Charted Accountant.

=== Singapore CFO Institute ===
The Singapore CFO Institute was officially launched in September 2011 at the inaugural CFO Connect. The Singapore CFO Institute is led by an advisory council currently chaired by Mr Chng Lay Chew, CFO, Singapore Exchange.
