= Our Singapore Conversation =

- Our Singapore Conversation Logo

Our Singapore Committee
- The full list of 26 members was announced on 8 September 2012

Committee Members
- Ms Cham Hui Fong, Mr Chan Chun Sing, Mr Stanley Chia Ding Li, Ms Chia Yong Yong, Dr Noorul Fatha As'art, Mdm Halimah Yacob, Mr Heng Swee Keat, Mr Ismail Hussein, Ms Indranee Rajah, Mr S. Shaikh Ismail, Ms Kuo Jian Hong, Ms Lee Huay Leng, Mr George Lim, Ms Lim Ru Ping, Asst Prof Mahdev Mohan, Mr Jeffrey Oon, Mr Thomas Pek, Ms Denise Phua, Mrs Jessie Phua, Ms Sim Ann, Prof Kenneth Paul Tan, Ms Teng Zi Ying, Mr Patrick Teo Han Cheng, Mr Bennett Theseira, Mr Lawrence Wong

Our Singapore Conversation is a national conversation initiative first announced by Prime Minister Lee Hsien Loong during his 2012 National Day Message.

Heng Swee Keat, then Minister for Education of Singapore, was appointed to lead the committee that will participate in the conversations with Singaporeans to create “a home with hope and heart”.

The committee held the first of an estimated 30 dialogue sessions with Singaporeans on 13 October 2012, involving "about 60 people from all walks of life, including taxi drivers, professionals, full-time national servicemen, university undergraduates and retirees."

== Committee ==
In PM Lee Hsien Loong's National Day Message, he promised that the committee leading the national conversation would be representative of the different segments of Singapore's society. This full list of 26 members of the committee was only announced later. Apart from 7 political office holders, the committee also included a taxi driver, a polytechnic student, an artist and a television host.

== Platforms ==
Various offline and online platforms have been set up to facilitate the conversation process, including a website and a Facebook page. The FB Page has since “garnered close to a hundred responses” as of early September 2012.

Local political observers have stated that for the National Conversation to be successful, it will be important to reach out to the silent majority.

== Participation by civil servants ==
On 11 October 2012, Singapore media reported that the country's 76,000 civil servants would be allowed to contribute to the Our Singapore Conversation with the lifting of a long-standing gag order preventing public servants from speaking publicly on government policies, although they are still not allowed to talk "about their current work or policies they worked on."

== Release of "Reflections" ==
On 10 August 2013, days after the engagements are completed, a newsletter called Reflections was released with the views of 47,000 people who took part in the conversations. The newsletter detailed five "aspirations" to guide future policies, being "opportunities" in the economy, "assurance" that people can access housing and affordable healthcare, "purpose" in lives where all achievements are celebrated beyond just economic ones with shared memories and heritage spaces valued, having community "spirit" with ground-up efforts and the disadvantaged taken care off and having "trust" between the Government and Singaporeans. In addition, many policy changes were announced in housing, healthcare and education, including a revamp to the Primary School Leaving Examination. This was done during that year's National Day Rally.
