= Collapse of Hotel New World =

1986 construction disaster in Singapore

- The site of the Hotel New World Collapse
- Date: 15 March 1986; 40 years ago
- Time: 11:25 am (UTC+08:00)
- Location: Rochor, Singapore
- Cause: Construction error
- Deaths: 33
- Injuries: 17
- Lian Yak Building
- Former names: New Serangoon Hotel
- Alternative names: Hotel New World

General information
- Status: Collapsed, Destroyed
- Location: Rochor, Singapore
- Coordinates: 1.311784°N 103.854879°E
- Opened: 1971; 55 years ago
- Destroyed: March 15, 1986; 40 years ago
- Client: Industrial and Commercial Bank Limited; Hotel New World
- Owner: Ng Khong Lim
- Affiliation: Lian Yak Realty

Technical details
- Floor count: 6

Other information
- Number of rooms: 67
- Number of restaurants: 1

The collapse of Hotel New World (Note: Since the accident, the building has been popularly called the Hotel New World.) was a civil disaster that occurred in Singapore on 15 March 1986. The Hotel New World was a six-story building situated at the junction of Serangoon Road and Owen Road in the Rochor district when it suddenly collapsed, trapping 50 people beneath the rubble. 33 people died and 17 people were rescued.

== Background ==
The Lian Yak Building (Chinese: 联益大厦) was completed in 1971 and consisted of six storeys and a basement garage. The Hotel New World, previously known as the New Serangoon Hotel until 1984, was the main tenant occupying the top four floors, and a branch of the Industrial & Commercial Bank (ICB) took up the ground level. A nightclub, Universal Neptune Nite-Club and Restaurant, was situated on the second level of the building at the time of the collapse.

The building had previously experienced a carbon monoxide gas leak in some of the hotel rooms on 29 August 1975, hospitalising 35 guests. Various witnesses, such as contractors and the night club's watchman, reported cracks in the building's walls between 1974 to 1983, though structural issues had not yet been observed. One day before the Lian Yak Building collapsed, a large crack appeared on a pillar at the nightclub and exposed the pillar's bricks. A mirror, installed on a column in the nightclub's dressing room, also spontaneously cracked, and the column's plywood panelling was bulging to the right. The building's owner, Ng Khong Lim, was informed of both instances, and ordered workers to prop up both columns; witnesses say that workers used timber planks as the props.

== Collapse ==
At 11:15 am on 15 March 1986, (Note: Witnesses of the accident gave different timings ranging from 11:00 am to 11:25 am. According to writer Joan Hon, at 11:26 am, the building's fire line activated the alarm in the Hill Street fire station; an Esso petrol station near the building had its electricity cut off during the collapse, and the hands of its wall clock display the same time. The Committee of Inquiry report, however, records the timing of the accident to be 11:15 am.) the building rapidly collapsed, creating a cloud of dust that enveloped surrounding properties. The collapse was met with shock by many, including the then-Prime Minister Lee Kuan Yew who was quoted as saying that "the collapse of such a building is unprecedented".

=== Casualties ===
Immediately after the collapse, as many as 300 were feared trapped underneath the debris. Estimates dropped to 100 trapped or missing a day later, and then to 60, including 26 hotel staff and 16 bank staff unaccounted for. The figure was finally put at 33 when the official death toll was announced on 22 March 1986 after the end of the rescue effort. Amongst those killed, 23 were Singaporeans, and the other ten foreigners.

== Rescue ==
=== Organisation of the Executive Group ===
After the collapse, many passers-by began to try pulling out survivors. A witness of the accident called the police to inform them of the accident, who thought it was initially a prank call. Upon further confirmation, the police informed the Ministry of Home Affairs and Singapore Armed Forces (SAF) of the collapse. The police also alerted the commissioner of the SCDF, Chng Teow Hua, who went to the site and had officers on stand-by. By the time he arrived to the site, there were only police and firefighting personnel. The SCDF soon arrived. Home affairs minister S. Jayakumar was in a meeting with other government officials when they received news of the collapse; despite the group being unsure of the extent of the collapse, the Executive Group (EG) was summoned, (Note: An emergency group originally conceived to resolve hijackings, but was designated as an emergency group for other crises months prior to the Hotel New World Collapse. The team consisted of Cheong Quee Wah, the First Permanent Secretary of the Ministry of Home Affairs, as the EG's chairman; Tan Chin Tiong, the Second Permanent Secretary of the Ministry of Home Affairs; Goh Yong Hong, Commissioner of Police; Tan Swan Beng, Director of Public Works; Lim Meng Kin, the Chief Medical officer of the SAF, and Lim Siam Kim, the Ministry of Home Affairs's Director of operations.) with Jayakumar ordering Second Permanent Secretary for the Ministry of Home Affairs Tan Chin Tiong, who was in charge of emergency planning, to alert the Singapore Civil Defence Force (SCDF). There was debate over if Tiong, permanent secretary Cheong Quee Wah, and the home affairs ministry's Director of Operations Lim Siam Kim should go to the site to ascertain the situation before activating the EG, though it was decided that every EG member would go to the site to save time and to allow every member to make a judgement.

Deputy Commissioner of Police for operations Tee Tua Ba, who was in charge of ground operations, went to the site. Upon arriving to the site, he found the Emergency Task Force conducting rescue operations alongside members of the public and some firemen. Tee decided to set up a command post, and the Police Command Post vehicle arrived later some time. To establish order, the site of the collapse was cordoned off to members of the public. Tee alerted hospitals and the Ministry of Health on the disaster, and the rest of the EG on the gravity of the situation. After receiving the news, Lim contacted various government departments, and Cheong drove him to the site. The duo arrived at 12:30 pm, and Lim contacted Jayakumar on the disaster, who in turn contacted deputy prime minister Goh Chok Tong. By then, "the Fire Service, SCDF, [and] even members of the public were digging in their own disorganised way", according to Cheong. Once the rest of the EG arrived, a piano shop was used as the group's base of operations as the mobile post's air conditioning was not working. The group had a meeting, and determined that Tee would take command of ground operations, Tan would ascertain the cause of the collapse and provide the group with engineers for consultation, and Lim would inform the media and the public of the progress of the rescue. At 1:50 pm, Jayakumar revealed to reporters that "there was no indication of a bomb explosion" causing the Lian Yak Building's collapse. The police estimated that 100 people were trapped underneath the building's rubble based on the number of rooms in the hotel and time of day. With assistance from a staff member of the building's bank, a missing persons list was created; the Public Works Department (PWD) created a detailed layout of the building with the help of the staff member along with the building's maintainer and an employee of the ICB investigating the collapse on the bank's behalf. The EG also moved their base of operations to the third storey of the Serangoon Plaza as it provided a view of the site.

Tee, on the other hand, organised a meeting on the best method for rescue with his Command and Control Group after the EG meeting. Two civil defence consultants suggested using the cut-and-lift method, which was approved by Jayakumar. Rescue work was initially conducted on the surface, much to the criticism of the public and media. Cranes and excavators had to be called for as the SAF's crane was unable to lift heavy parts of the rubble. Work was initially slow, with Chng recalling that "the crowd grew restless and booed and called all kinds of insulting remarks, and began to pressurise us to keep on trying something". Chng also became commander of the rescue forces since he had prior experience with heavy machinery.

=== Tunnelling ===
To create a rescue plan, the EG would need to have the plans for the building. They sent a deputy director of the PWD to retrieve the plans, though was unsuccessful as the offices were closed. A copy of the building's plans were borrowed from the Mass Rapid Transit Corporation (MRTC), and the EG discovered that the building's car-park was underneath a pavement. Tan proposed to dig underneath the pavement as there might be survivors, and mooted to sink a trench next to the basement's wall. The PWD and SCDF could not carry out this proposal due to constraints, so it was proposed to Cheong that MRTC tunnelling experts would carry out the operation. Local tunnelling experts as well as those from Japan, Ireland, and the United Kingdom who were involved in nearby construction for the Mass Rapid Transit (MRT) offered to assist. The workers employed the cut-and-lift method to remove the rubble, and by 5:00 am the next day, much of the upper rubble. They became concerned that the use of heavy machinery might collapse the rubble onto those trapped. Their volunteer efforts, digging four tunnels under the rubble, resulted in the rescue of another eight survivors. The tunnelling experts were later honoured by the Singapore government for their efforts.

As there were survivors buried in the rubble, the rescue was a delicate operation. Debris was carefully removed as power saws and drills cut through the rubble. Sound detectors were used to locate survivors beneath the slabs by picking up faint moans and cries. In the first 12 hours, nine people were rescued by the SAF. At one time, Lieutenant-Colonel Lim Meng Kin (SAF Chief Medical Officer), along with several other SAF medical officers and two doctors from the Health Ministry, took turns crawling through narrow spaces inside the rubble in an effort to provide assistance to trapped survivors, giving glucose and saline drips to them.

The last survivor, 30-year-old Chua Kim Choo, was rescued on 18 March 1986, having survived after hiding beneath a table in the basement. Rescuers worked in three teams in attempt to reach her via tunnels. A body had to be cut in half as it was blocking one of the paths. Power tools to hack through a concrete beam were further limited as leaked petrol from cars parked in the basement car park was detected. Seventeen people were rescued and 33 died following the six-day rescue operation that ended on 21 March.

== Committee of Inquiry ==
Prior to the collapse, witnesses reported hearing an explosion, but Jayakumar declared that "there was no indication of a bomb explosion". A gas explosion was thought to be a possible cause. Engineers interviewed by The Straits Times on the first day of rescue efforts gave different speculations on the cause of the collapse, ranging from column failures to soil subsidence, arguing that serious structural problems with the building would have been apparent. First Deputy Prime Minister Goh Chok Tong ordered a Commission of Inquiry investigation into the accident. During the first day of the collapse, the EG agreed that Tan Swee Beng would go back the Ministry of Home Affairs's office to draft the Commission of Inquiry report. Many potential causes of the accident were investigated. Surviving sections of concrete were tested to ensure they were built to proper construction standards and it was found that they were. The ongoing construction of the underground railway – built by tunnellers who had assisted in the rescue – was investigated, even though the excavations were more than 100 yards (91 m) from the collapsed building. It was found that MRT construction had no effect on the building's stability.

Also investigated were the various additions made to the building after its initial construction. Air conditioning systems had been constructed on the roof of the building, the bank had added a large safe, and ceramic tiles had been fixed to the building's exterior, all adding considerably to the building's weight. It was found that the weight of these additions was inconsequential: the original structural engineer had made an error in calculating the building's structural load. The structural engineer had calculated the building's live load (the weight of the building's potential inhabitants, furniture, fixtures, and fittings) but the building's dead load (the weight of the building itself) was completely omitted from the calculation. This meant that the building as constructed could not support its own weight. Three different supporting columns had failed in the days before the disaster. The other columns – which took on the added weight no longer supported by the failed columns – could not support the building.

According to the local Channel News Asia (CNA), Lian Yak Building was designed by an unqualified draftsman instead of a professional structural engineer. An investigator found that he had over-estimated the dead weight which the columns and walls could support. The draftsman claimed that the building owner Ng Khong Lim (Chinese: 黃康霖; Pe̍h-ōe-jī: n̂g khong lîm), who eventually died in the collapse incident, had appointed him to design Lian Yak Building, but Ng directed that building work. The investigator also found that Ng requested to use inferior materials to build Lian Yak Building in order to reduce the cost – ultimately costing his life.

== Aftermath ==
=== Awards ===
On 27 April 1986, the Government of Singapore honoured five individuals for their assistance in rescue efforts, including three from Ireland, one from the United Kingdom and a local Singaporean. A dinner was also hosted by the Singapore government on 29 April 1986 for public transport operator SMRT Corporation staff involved in the rescue efforts, with Minister of Communications and Information, Yeo Ning Hong, as the guest of honour.

=== Legislature ===
Following this disaster, all buildings built in the 1970s in Singapore were thoroughly checked for structural faults, with some of them declared structurally unsound and evacuated for demolition, including the main block of Hwa Chong Junior College and Catholic High School campus at Queen Street.

The government also introduced tighter and stringent regulations on building construction; since 1989, all structural designs are required to be counter-checked by multiple Accredited Checkers. The Singapore Civil Defence Force (SCDF) also underwent a significant upgrade, in terms of training and equipment, to improve its readiness in performing future possible complex rescue operations.

=== Site ===
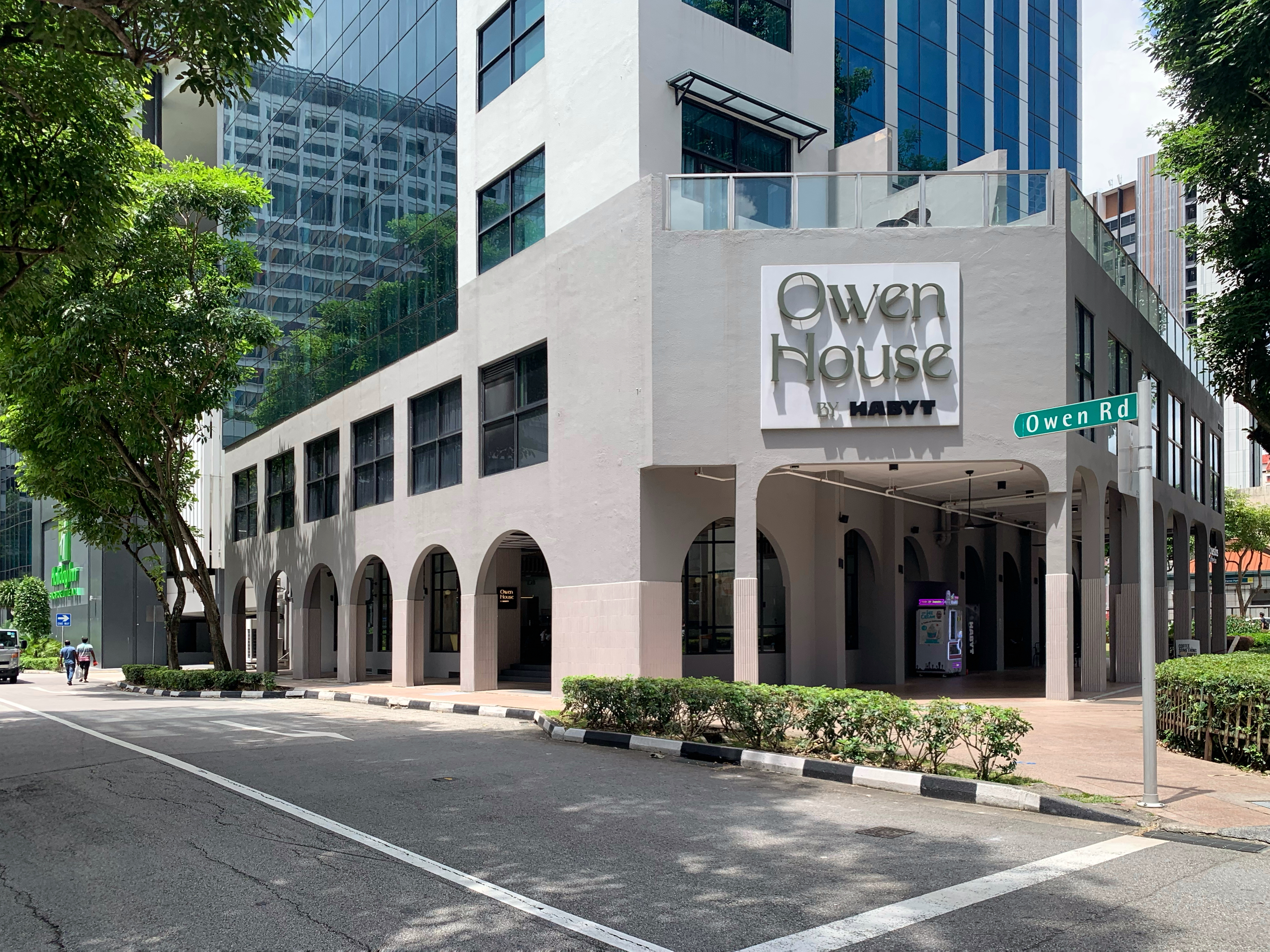
The former site of the building as photographed in 2025. The building is now Owen House, replacing the old Fortuna Hotel

Five years after the collapse, construction work commenced on the site for a new seven-story hotel on 28 March 1991. The Fortuna Hotel opened with 85 rooms in 1994.

== In media ==
- In July 1986, Singaporean singer-songwriter Kelvin Tan contributed to BigO magazine's Nothing on the Radio cassette the song "Seen the End", after spending two nights at the former Hotel New World site.
- In 1990, the disaster was re-enacted in the Chinese-language television series Finishing Line (出人头地), which was aired on SBC 8.
- On 25 September 2003, the disaster was featured in the first episode of the second season of the television series True Courage, which was broadcast on English-language MediaCorp TV Channel 5. A Chinese-language version of the series, titled True Courage (逆境勇者), was also on aired on MediaCorp TV Channel 8.
- On 27 September 2005, Seconds From Disaster portrayed the disaster in the episode Hotel Collapse Singapore. Instead of the actual site, the program used an image of the area around 88 Syed Alwi Road (at the corner of Kampong Kapor Road) as the basis for a computer-generated reconstruction of the building and its collapse. The episode was retelecast in Singapore on 16 September 2007 via StarHub TV.
- In February 2015, Days of Disasters also portrayed the disaster in the episode Hotel New World Collapse. It was also featured in the drama The Journey: Our Homeland.

== Sources ==
- Hon, Joan (1987). Hotel New World Collapse. Singapore: Times Books International.
- Resilience Through Heritage I: Hotel New World (PDF). National Heritage Board.
- Thean, L.P.; et al. (1987), Report of the Inquiry into the Collapse of Hotel New World, Singapore: Singapore National Printers, OCLC 24545169
