= 1961 in Singapore =

- Decades: 1940s; 1950s; 1960s; 1970s; 1980s
- See also: Other events of 1961; Timeline of Singaporean history

The following lists events that happened during 1961 in Singapore.

Table	1961	1962	1963
Births	59930	58977	59530
Deaths	10027	10178	10138

== Incumbents ==
- Yang di-Pertuan Negara – Yusof Ishak
- Prime Minister – Lee Kuan Yew

== Events ==
=== February ===
- 20 February – The Singapore Malay National Organisation (PKNS) is formed as a branch of UMNO. It later split following independence.

=== April ===
- 29 April – A by-election is held in Hong Lim after Ong Eng Guan resigned from his seat following expulsion from the People's Action Party (PAP). As two other candidates were disqualified, it is a contest between Ong and PAP's Jek Yuen Thong, which Ong regained his seat.

=== May ===
- 24 May – The Women's Charter is passed, guaranteeing women's rights and equality in families. The Charter started on 15 September.
- 25 May – The Bukit Ho Swee Fire kills 4 people and destroys 2,200 attap houses.
- 27 May – Tunku Abdul Rahman, the Prime Minister of Malaya, proposes a merger between Singapore, Malaya, Sabah, Sarawak and Brunei (which pulled out last minute due to the Brunei Revolt).

=== July ===
- 15 July – A by-election is held after assemblyman Baharuddin bin Ariff died a few months earlier. The People's Action Party lost this by-election; the second in a row, with David Marshall from the Workers' Party winning the Anson seat.
- 25 July – The Singapore Trade Union Congress (STUC) splits, caused by an ideological split in the People's Action Party.
- 26 July – Shell opens Singapore's first oil refinery at Pulau Bukom.

=== August ===
- 1 August – The Economic Development Board is formed to create opportunities for Singapore businesses.
- 12 August – The National Iron and Steel Mills (present-day NatSteel) is formed to develop Singapore's steel industry.
- 13 August – Barisan Sosialis is registered as an opposition party, which dissolved and merged with the Workers' Party in 1988.
- 16 August – The Singapore Association of Trade Unions (SATU) is formed after STUC's split earlier in July. The union is declared illegal in 1963 after conducting activities that threatened Singapore's national security.

=== September ===
- 6 September – The National Trades Union Congress is formed to represent workers.
- 13 September – 9 October – Lee Kuan Yew delivered a series of 12 radio talks in English, Mandarin and Malay to campaign for a merger with Malaysia. This also includes exposing the Communists' real ideology and reason for opposing the merger.
- 16–17 September – The first Singapore Grand Prix is held at Thomson Road.

=== October ===
- 15 October – The Sang Nila Utama Secondary School is officially opened, making it Singapore's first Malay-medium secondary school. By 1968, it started to offer English-medium lessons.

=== November ===
- 16 November – A White Paper on the proposed merger with Malaya is published. It outlines similar citizenships, passports and rights for Singapore citizens when in Federation, at least 15 seats in the Federal House of Representatives and two in the Senate, maintaining of Singapore's free port status, how the Head of State will be appointed, among others.

=== December ===
- 11–16 December – Singapore took part in the 2nd South East Asian Peninsular Games. It clinched the fifth place, accumulating a total of 28 medals.

=== Date unknown ===
- The State Development Plan 1961–1964 is published. It aims to improve conditions in Singapore, during a time of high unemployment.
- Queenstown New Town is being built and expanded to cater for a growing population. This comes after slow progress under the previous Singapore Improvement Trust.

== Births ==
- 23 January – Mas Selamat Kastari – Known for 2008 escape.
- 25 January – Vivian Balakrishnan – Minister for Foreign Affairs.
- 4 February – Edmund Chen – Former actor. Married with Xiang Yun, also born in 1961.
- 6 February – Chen Show Mao – Former politician.
- 12 February – Chen Jin Lang – Former singer. (d. 2006)
- 19 May – David Ong – Former politician.
- 14 July – Heng Chee How – Politician.
- 16 August – Lui Tuck Yew – Former politician.
- 15 September – Xie Shaoguang – Actor.
- 27 October – Xiang Yun – Actress. Married with Edmund Chen.
- 1 November – Heng Swee Keat – Deputy Prime Minister of Singapore.
- Desmond Sim – Playwright, poet, writer, painter.
- Isabella Loh – Chairperson of Singapore Environment Council.
- Kelly Tang – Composer.
- Ovidia Yu – Novelist, playwright.

== Deaths ==
- 30 January – Goh Hood Keng, first Straits Chinese to be ordained Methodist minister (b. 1888).
- 20 April – Baharuddin bin Ariff, PAP legislative assemblyman for Anson Constituency (b. 1933).
- 26 April – Lu Baiye, writer (b. 1923).
- 12 August – Tan Kah Kee, businessman, philanthropist and Chinese community leader (b. 1874).

== See also ==
- List of years in Singapore
