= 1964 in Singapore =

- Decades: 1940s; 1950s; 1960s; 1970s; 1980s
- See also: Other events of 1964; Timeline of Singaporean history

The following lists events that happened during 1964 in Singapore.

- Singapore was still part of the Federation of Malaysia

== Incumbents ==
- Yang di-Pertuan Negara – Yusof Ishak
- Prime Minister – Lee Kuan Yew

== Events ==
=== January ===
- 1 January – The Singapore Tourism Promotion Board (present day Singapore Tourism Board) is formed to promote Singapore as a destination for visitors.
- 20 January – Cold Storage's new carbon dioxide factory is officially opened, which is required for dry ice and carbonated drinks.

=== February ===
- 12 February – The Housing and Development Board launches a new scheme known as the Home Ownership for the People Scheme. This enabled Singaporeans to buy flats for a lease of 99 years.

=== March ===
- 1 March – The People's Action Party decides to send in candidates for the 1964 Malaysian general election, which is held on 25 April. The decision caused an outroar in Kuala Lumpur. It only won the Bangsar seat.
- 31 March – The Khong Guan Flour Milling factory is officially opened, making it the first flour mill in Singapore. This will allow biscuit companies and bakeries to rely on locally produced flour instead of imported flour.

=== April ===
- 1 April – The Port of Singapore Authority is formed, taking over the previous Singapore Harbour Board and the Master Attendant.
- 24 April – The Singapore Tourism Promotion Board adopts the Merlion as its new emblem.

=== May ===
- 20 May – The Singapore Tourism Promotion Board's new office is officially opened.

=== July ===
- 21 July – The 1964 racial riots occurred between Malays and Chinese, during a birthday celebration procession of Muhammad. By the end of the riots, 23 people are killed, with 454 others injured.

=== August ===
- 13 August – After a series of blasts caused by the Confrontation, a sea curfew is imposed so as to prevent saboteurs from setting into Singapore, resulting in fishermen not being able to fish at night.

=== September ===
- 2 September – The second racial riot occurred between Malays and Chinese after the murder of a Malay Trishaw rider. By the time the riots ended, 13 people are killed, with 106 injured.

=== October ===
- 31 October – Malaysia Dairy Industries new factory is officially opened to produce condensed milk locally. It has since branched into fruit juices and other dairy products.

=== November ===
- 28 November – The Singapore Institute of Management is registered as Singapore's first management institute. It aims to create a pool of industrial managers for the newly built factories, which are important for Singapore's economy.

=== December ===
- December – Work starts on Toa Payoh, which will house 250,000 people when completed.
- 4–21 December – The first sports festival, Pesta Sukan, is held in Singapore.

== Births ==
- 20 March – Liang Eng Hwa, PAP MP for Bukit Panjang SMC.
- 29 March – Grace Fu, current Minister of Sustainability and the Environment.
- 26 April – Nicky Moey, writer.
- 24 May – Arthur Fong, banker and former PAP MP for West Coast GRC.
- 27 May – Zheng Geping, actor, executive producer and businessman.
- 6 June – Junie Sng, Olympic swimmer
- 22 August – Kelvin Tan, musician, writer and lecturer.
- 25 August – Azmin Ali, Malaysian politician.
- 7 November – Li Nanxing, actor.
- 17 November – Lim Tean, lawyer and 1st Secretary-General of the People's Alliance for Reform.
- 20 November – Ong Keng Sen, artistic director of TheatreWorks.
- 24 December – Tan See Leng, current Minister for Manpower.

=== Dates unknown ===
- Sabri Buang, writer, theatre director.
- Philip Jeyaretnam, counsel, writer.
- Liang Wern Fook, Chinese literature pioneer.

== Deaths ==
- 24 January – Lee Wee Nam, entrepreneur and Teochew community leader (b. 1881).
- 20 March – Patrick McKerron, 1st Colonial Secretary of Singapore (b. 1896).
- 21 April – Chew Hean Swee, Chinese community leader, businessman and a close associate of Sun Yat-sen (b. 1887).
- 20 June – Loke Wan Tho, founder of Cathay Organisation (b. 1915).
- 1 July – Awang Bakar, footballer (b. 1936).
- 16 November – Lim Seow Beng, lawyer (b. 1926).
