= 1960 in Singapore =

- Decades: 1940s; 1950s; 1960s; 1970s; 1980s
- See also: Other events of 1960; Timeline of Singaporean history

The following lists events that happened during 1960 in Singapore.

== Incumbents ==
- Yang di-Pertuan Negara – Yusof Ishak
- Prime Minister – Lee Kuan Yew

== Events ==
=== February ===
- 1 February – The Housing and Development Board is set up by Lim Kim San, replacing the Singapore Improvement Trust. The Planning Authority takes over SIT's functions of land use in Singapore.

=== July ===
- 1 July – The People's Association is formed.

=== August ===
- 28 August – 600 employees of the Singapore Glass Factory go on a strike lasting 73 days.

=== September ===
- 6 September – The National Library launches a new mobile library service.
- 8 September – Tan Howe Liang wins a silver medal during the 1960 Summer Olympics.
- 27 September- The Internal Security Council was formed

=== November ===
- 12 November – The Old National Library Building (demolished in 2004) was opened.

=== Date unknown ===
- Far East Organization, a property developer was founded.
- The Primary School Leaving Examination(PSLE) was first introduced as a mandatory examination in Singapore, the exam was meant for 12 years old who are leaving Primary Schools and moving on into Secondary Schools

== Births ==
- 7 January – Hong Huifang, actress.
- 24 January – Jack Neo, film director.
- 17 March – Ruth Langsford, presenter in the United Kingdom.
- 29 March – Paddy Chew, actor (d. 1999).
- 20 June – Jeremy Monteiro, singer.
- 19 August – Wee Siew Kim, former politician.
- 24 November – Shirley Ng, sports shooter.
- Isa Kamari, author.

== Deaths ==
- 23 February – Noel L. Clarke, former Member of the Legislative Council of the Straits Settlements and Eurasian community leader (b. 1885).
- 25 March – Tan Theng Chiang, former Labour Front legislative assemblyman for Rochor Constituency (b. 1915).
- 20 May – Ng Sen Choy, businessman and Democratic Party candidate for Stamford Constituency in the 1955 General Election (b. 1887).
- 15 June – Koh Woon Chi, one of the three Great Singaporean Chinese calligraphers (b. 1890).
- 5 July – Chua Ho San, Teochew community leader and businessman (b. 1904).
- 6 July – Lim Peng Mau, Chinese community leader and businessman (b. 1884).
- 15 November – Ng Eng Kee, philanthropist and businessman in the rubber trade (b. 1880).
- 3 December – John Laycock, lawyer and founder of the Singapore Progressive Party (b. 1887).

== See also ==
- List of years in Singapore
