= 1959 in Singapore =

- Decades: 1930s; 1940s; 1950s; 1960s; 1970s
- See also: Other events of 1959; Timeline of Singaporean history

The following lists events that happened during 1959 in Singapore.

== Incumbents ==
- Governor of Singapore
  - Sir William Allmond Codrington Goode ( until 2 June)
- Yang di-Pertuan Negara
  - Sir William Allmond Codrington Goode (from 3 June to 2 December)
  - Yusof Ishak (from 3 December)
- Chief Minister – Lim Yew Hock (until June 3)
- Prime Minister – Lee Kuan Yew (from 5 June)
- Chief Secretary: Edgeworth Beresford David (till 2 June)

== Events ==
=== May ===
- 30 May – The 1959 General Elections was held. Lee Kuan Yew was elected as Prime Minister of Singapore.

=== June ===
- 3 June – The 1958 State of Singapore Constitution is adopted, allowing for self-governance in Singapore.
- 5 June – The first Cabinet is sworn into power.
- 8 June – A campaign against decadent lifestyles is launched.
- 20 June – The Ministry of National Development will start a team with seven Assembly members from 22 June, with many departments to be consolidated under MND. The Singapore Improvement Trust will also be brought under the Ministry in future.
- 25 June – The Ministry of National Development forms the Primary Production Department to better serve farmers and fishermen.

=== October ===
- 23 October – Various departments of the City Council and Rural Board will be absorbed into the Ministry of National Development, Ministry of Health and Ministry of Labour and Law.

=== November ===
- 11 November- The National Anthem "Majulah Singapura" was selected as the National Anthem of Singapore.

=== December ===
- 3 December – Encik Yusof bin Ishak is sworn in as Singapore's second Yang di-Pertuan Negara. On the same day, the National Flag of Singapore, the Coat of arms of Singapore and the national anthem, Majulah Singapura, are unveiled.
- 12–17 December – Singapore participates in the 1959 Southeast Asian Peninsular Games, the first SEAP event. It came in fourth with 33 medals.

== Births ==
- 9 February – Gan Kim Yong, Minister for Trade and Industry.
- 26 February – Lim Hwee Hua, former politician, first woman in Singapore's Cabinet.
- 12 March – Kenneth Jeyaratnam, politician and hedge fund manager.
- 26 March – K. Shanmugam, Minister for Home Affairs and Minister for Law.
- 24 June – Raymond Lim, former politician.
- 25 September – Leong Mun Wai, politician and former investment banker.
- 25 November – Marrie Lee, director, producer, writer and actress.
- 9 December – Denise Phua, politician.

== Deaths ==
- 14 March – Tan Thoon Lip, lawyer and public official (b. 1910).
- 30 March – James Lornie, Scottish colonial administrator (b. 1876).
- 5 April – Teo Eng Hock, rubber tycoon and one of the founders of the Singapore branch of the Tongmenghui (b. 1872).

== See also ==
- List of years in Singapore
- 1959 Singaporean general election
- 1959
