= 1962 in Singapore =

- Decades: 1940s; 1950s; 1960s; 1970s; 1980s
- See also: Other events of 1962; Timeline of Singaporean history

The following lists events that happened during 1962 in Singapore.

== Incumbents ==
- Yang di-Pertuan Negara – Yusof Ishak
- Prime Minister – Lee Kuan Yew

== Events ==
=== April ===
- 10 April – The SEACOM cable is announced.

=== September ===
- 1 September – A referendum is held in Singapore to vote on merger with Malaysia. In the end, 70 percent of votes chose merger in accordance with the terms of the 1961 White Paper.

=== December ===
- 16 December - Trolleybus services in Singapore cease operations.

== Births ==
- 6 February – Eleanor Wong – Lawyer, playwright.
- 28 March – Alvin Yeo – Lawyer and former politician (d. 2022)
- 29 May – Fandi Ahmad – Former football player.
- 14 June – S. Iswaran – Minister of Transport.
- 27 October – Ang Peng Siong – Former swimmer.
- Olivia Lum – Hyflux CEO.
- Jennifer Tham – Conductor of Singapore Youth Choir.
- K. F. Seetoh – Food personality, creator of Makansutra.
- Madeleine Lee – Investment manager, poet.
- Charis Eng - Clinical geneticist (d. 2024)

== Deaths ==
- 15 January – Shenton Thomas, last Governor of the Straits Settlements (b. 1879).
- 9 June – Florence Yeo Ah Chik, spouse of Hougang's Beehoon King Lim Ah Pin (b. 1887).
- 21 August – Ahmad Ibrahim, Cabinet Minister and PAP legislative assemblyman for Sembawang Constituency (b. 1927).
- 30 September – Yong Mun Sen, watercolour artist and a founding member of the Nanyang Academy of Fine Arts (b. 1896).
