= 1963 in Singapore =

- Decades: 1940s; 1950s; 1960s; 1970s; 1980s
- See also: Other events of 1963; Timeline of Singaporean history

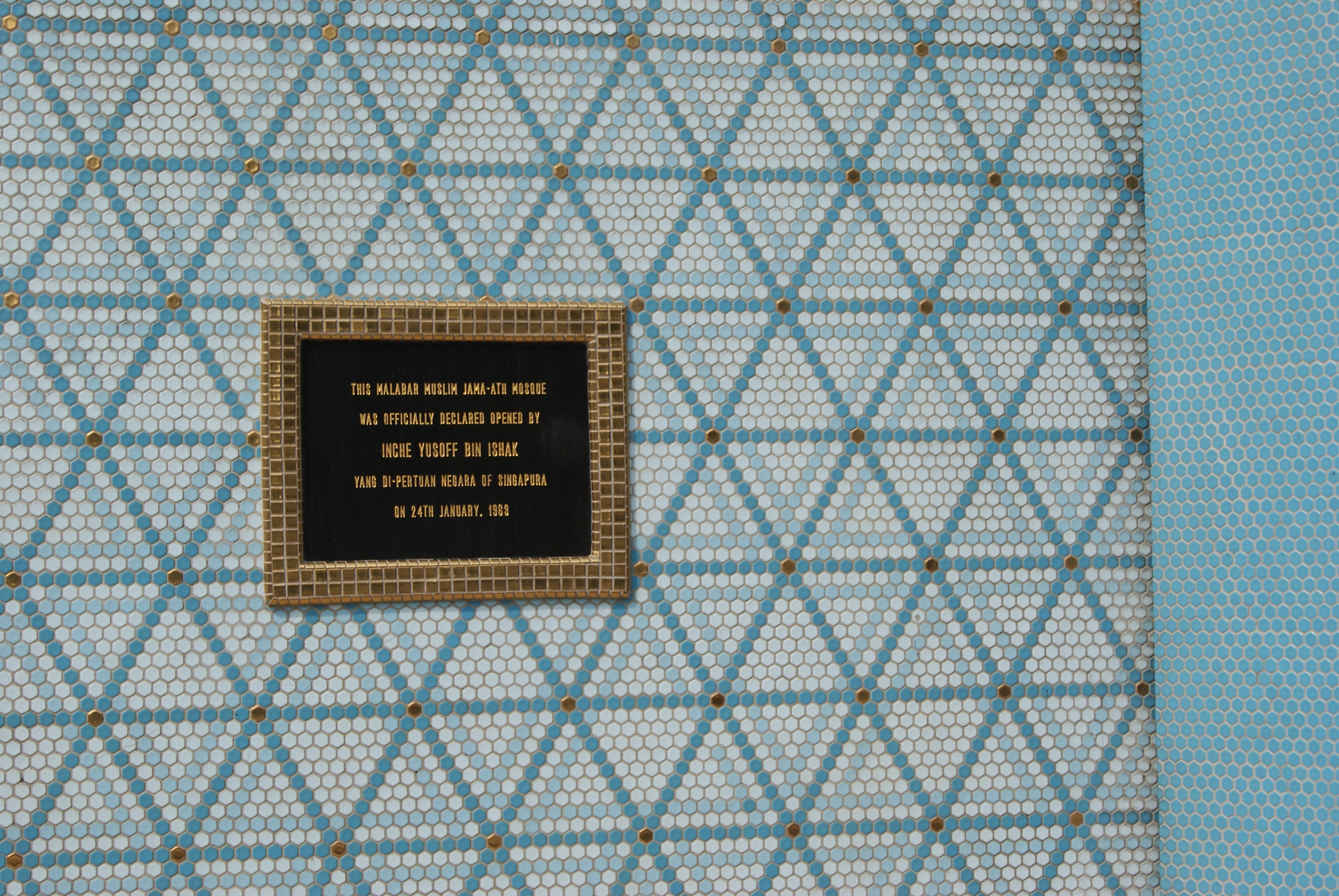
Plaque commemorating the official opening of Masjid Malabar

The following lists events that happened during 1963 in Singapore.

- Singapore was a 14th State of Malaysia beginning 16 September 1963.

== Incumbents ==
- Yang di-Pertuan Negara – Yusof Ishak
- Prime Minister – Lee Kuan Yew

== Events ==
=== January ===
- 6 January – The OG factory is officially opened.
- 20 January – Confrontation was announced.

=== February ===
- 2 February – Operation Coldstore was mounted to stop communist influence, resulting in 113 people being arrested.
- 15 February – The first TV station was launched on Channel 5. Regular television transmissions only started from 2 April.

=== March ===
- 13 March – The Civilian War Memorial will be built at Beach Road.

=== April ===
- 22 April – City Hall riot.

=== May ===
- 1 May – The Public Utilities Board is formed to manage electricity, water and gas.
- 25 May – The Ngee Ann College is officially opened, changing name from Ngee Ann Technical College and finally present-day Ngee Ann Polytechnic.

=== June ===
- 16 June – The first tree in Singapore is planted in Farrer Circus by Prime Minister Lee Kuan Yew, which is a mempat tree.

=== July ===
- 9 July – The 20-point agreement, submitted by North Borneo, was signed by the UK government and representatives of Malaya, Sabah, Sarawak and Singapore in the run-up to the creation of the Federation of Malaysia.
- 12 July - Pulau Senang prison riot.

=== August ===
- 8 August – The National Theatre is opened.
- 25 August – A rally was held in City Hall.
- 28 August – A report to improve education was released.
- 31 August – Singapore declared its independence from the United Kingdom, with Yusof bin Ishak as the head of state (Yang di-Pertuan Negara) and Lee Kuan Yew as prime minister; sixteen days later, Singapore would join the Federation of Malaysia, but would declare independence again on 9 August 1965. On the same day, the 1963 State Constitution is adopted.

=== September ===
- 7 September – City Developments Limited is formed as a property group.
- 16 September – Malaysia is formed from Malaya, Sabah, Sarawak and Singapore.
- 21 September – The PAP wins the 1963 State Elections, defeating the Barisan Sosialis and UMNO.

=== November ===
- 13 November – The Singapore Association of Trade Unions (SATU) is refused registration for being prejudicial to Singapore's national security, leading to its eventual dissolution.
- 23 November – Channel 8 is launched as Singapore's second TV channel.

== Births ==
- 12 April – Indranee Rajah, Minister in the Prime Minister's Office.
- 16 April – Masagos Zulkifli, Minister for Social and Family Development and Second Minister for Health.
- 20 September – Ivan Heng, Stage actor, director, founder of W!LD RICE.
- Koh Buck Song – Writer, journalist.
- Heng Siok Tian – Art educator.
- Yang Lina - Actress (d. 2010).

== Deaths ==
- 14 February – Lim Hak Tai, pioneer artist and art educator (b. 1893).
- 9 August – E. V. Davies, former Labour Party City Councillor for North Constituency (b. 1891).
- 18 August – Carl Alexander Gibson-Hill, last British director of Raffles Museum (present day National Museum of Singapore) (b. 1911).
- 20 October – Hugh Zehnder, lawyer and prominent leader of the Eurasian community (b. 1879).
- 27 October – Huang Mun Se, art collector and Chairman of South Seas Society (b. 1890).
- Haji Ambo Sooloh, Malay businessman of Bugis descent (b. 1891).
