= 1958 in Singapore =

- Decades: 1930s; 1940s; 1950s; 1960s; 1970s
- See also: Other events of 1958; Timeline of Singaporean history

The following lists events that happened during 1958 in Colony of Singapore.

== Incumbents ==
- Governor: Sir William Allmond Codrington Goode
- Chief Minister: Lim Yew Hock
- Chief Secretary: Edgeworth Beresford David (starting 29 January 1958)

== Events ==
=== March ===
- 30 March – Nanyang University, a private university using the Chinese language (Singaporean Mandarin) is officially opened. It eventually merged with the University of Singapore to form the National University of Singapore.

=== April ===
- 3 April – Times House is officially opened, serving as the operation headquarters of Singapore's newspapers.

=== May ===
- 13 May – The third Merdeka Talks took place, which concluded with the same agreement from 1957.

=== July ===
- 1 July – The Legal Aid Bureau is created to assist the need with legal matters.

=== August ===
- 1 August – Royal assent was given to the State of Singapore Act 1958, providing for internal self-government for Singapore
- 8 August – The Master Plan, which was intended to guide Singapore's development over a two-decade period, is approved by the Singapore government and comes into force.
- 9 August – The first air-conditioned supermarket, Fitzpatrick's Supermarket is officially opened. Since then, the area has been taken over by The Paragon.

=== November ===
- 22 November – The Shaw House, a 10-storey office block, is officially opened by then Chief Minister Lim Yew Hock.
- 24 November – The Syariah Court is established to tighten divorce processes and safeguard marriages.

=== Date Unknown ===
- The National Anthem "Majulah Singapura" is composed by Zubir Said and was selected as the National Anthem a year later on 11 November 1959 when Singapore gained full internal self governance from the British, the anthem was formally adopted as Singapore's National Anthem after it gained Independence in 1965.

== Births ==
- 23 February – T. Sasitharan, theatre educator.
- 14 March – Zuraida Kamaruddin, former Malaysian Cabinet Minister.
- 19 March – Sin Boon Ann, former PAP Member of Parliament for Tampines GRC.
- 10 April – Bernard Chong, physician and watch collector.
- 26 July – Woon Tai Ho, founder of Channel NewsAsia.
- 19 August – Cynthia Phua, business executive and former PAP Member of Parliament for Aljunied GRC.
- 13 October – Sam Tan, former Minister of State.
- 10 December – Ng Eng Hen, former Minister for Defence.

== Deaths ==
- 1 January – Ong Piah Teng, businessman and nominated legislative assemblyman of the 1st Legislative Assembly (b. 1892).
- 2 April – Yin Suat Chuan, physician (b. 1876).
- 14 April – Lee Leung Ki, founder and 1st General Manager of Asia Insurance Company (b. 1890).
- 8 May – Kung Tian Siong, former managing proprietor of Empire Cinema and 72nd descendant of Confucius (b. 1876).
- 6 June – George Herbert Garlick, 1st radiologist and medical director of the Singapore Anti–Tuberculosis Association (b. 1886).
- 4 July – Woo Mon Chew, Cantonese community leader, businessman and major building contractor (b. 1887).
- 8 November – Chong Thutt Pitt, solicitor and former Progressive Party municipal councillor for North Constituency (b. 1900).

== See also ==
- List of years in Singapore
