= 1967 in Singapore =

- Decades: 1940s; 1950s; 1960s; 1970s; 1980s
- See also: Other events of 1967; Timeline of Singaporean history

The following lists events that happened during 1967 in Singapore.

- National Service was first introduced in Singapore by Defence Minister, Goh Keng Swee

== Incumbents ==
- President: Yusof Ishak
- Prime Minister: Lee Kuan Yew

== Events ==
=== January ===
- 27 January – The Chartered Industries of Singapore is established to produce ammunition for the Singapore Armed Forces.

=== February ===
- 15 February – The Civilian War Memorial is unveiled at the War Memorial Park.
- 24 February – 1967 by-elections: Nomination day is held for the by-elections. After nominations closed, People's Action Party (PAP) candidates Teo Hup Teck (Jalan Kayu), Chew Chin Han (Tampines), Pathmanaban Selvadurai (Bukit Panjang) and Lim Soo Peng (Havelock) win their seats via a walkover. However, there is a contest for the Thomson seat, where PAP's Ang Nam Piau campaigned against two independent candidates, M. P. D. Nair and Chan Yoke Kwong.

=== March ===
- 7 March – The 1967 by-election is held in the Thomson constituency only. After polling closed, PAP's Ang Nam Piau won by a huge majority of 9,407 votes against M. P. D. Nair and Chan Yoke Kwong, who had garnered 1,310 and 537 votes respectively. The by-election resulted in the PAP having all the seats in Parliament until the 1981 Anson by-election, where J. B. Jeyaretnam from the Workers' Party wins the by-election.
- 14 March – The National Service bill is passed by the parliament.
- 18 March – Shin Min Daily News is launched.
- 28 March – Registrations for National Service begin at the Central Manpower Base.
- 30 March – The SEACOM cable is launched. The cable went in operation until its decommissioning in 1986.

=== April ===
- 7 April – The Board of Commissioners of Currency, Singapore (present day Monetary Authority of Singapore) is established with the power to issue Singapore currency.

=== May ===
- 5 May – The Republic of Singapore Navy is formed.
- 11 May – The Garden City vision was introduced to make Singapore a clean and green city, with the planting of trees.

=== June ===
- 12 June – The first currency notes, known as the Orchid series were issued, as well as the Marine Series.

=== July ===
- July – The first batch of the army is drafted for National Service.

=== August ===
- 8 August – Singapore is one of the founding members of the Association of Southeast Asian Nations (ASEAN).

=== October ===
- 30 October - The Science Council of Singapore is formed to develop Singapore's capabilities in science and technology.

== Births ==
- 1 July – Kym Ng, actress.
- 31 March – Ang Wei Neng, politician and business leader.
- 13 April – Jimmy Nah, actor and comedian. (d. 2008)
- 12 June – Penny Low, former PAP MP for Pasir Ris–Punggol GRC.
- 6 October – Terence Cao, actor.
- 30 October – Murali Pillai, PAP MP for Bukit Batok SMC and Jurong East–Bukit Batok GRC.
- 31 October – Mardan Mamat, golf player.
- 21 November – Benedict Tan, former national sailor.
- Claire Tham, author.
- Joan Pereira, PAP MP for Tanjong Pagar GRC.
- Desmond Lim, 2nd Chairman of the Singapore Democratic Alliance.

== Deaths ==
- 5 January – Xing Ying, writer and editor of literary supplements (b. 1911).
- 26 February – Hu Tie Jun, former Deputy Commander of Dalforce during the Battle of Singapore (b. 1909).
- 19 May – Chew Hock Leong, former Chairman of the Public Service Commission and former General Manager of OCBC (b. 1897).
- 2 June – Lee Kong Chian, businessman, philanthropist and Chinese community leader (b. 1893).
- 14 June – Yeo Chan Boon, Teochew community leader (b. 1881).
- 6 November – Ng Keng Siang, architect (b. 1908).
- 28 December – Oh Su Chen, former Chairperson of the PAP Women's Wing and PAP candidate for Cairnhill Constituency in the 1959 General Election (b. 1913).
