= 1957 in Singapore =

- Decades: 1930s; 1940s; 1950s; 1960s; 1970s
- See also: Other events of 1957; Timeline of Singaporean history

The following lists events that happened during 1957 in Colony of Singapore.

== Incumbents ==
- Governor:
  - until 9 December: Sir Robert Brown Black
  - starting 9 December: Sir William Goode
- Chief Minister: Lim Yew Hock
- Chief Secretary:
  - until 9 December: Sir William Goode

== Events ==
=== February ===
- 7 February – A series of conference starts to prepare for the upcoming Merdeka Talks.

=== March ===
- 5 March – Lim Yew Hock lays out his proposals for the upcoming Merdeka Talks.
- 11 March – The second Merdeka Talks took place.
- 21 March – The Singapore Industrial Promotion Board was formed to develop various industries in colonial Singapore.

=== April ===
- 11 April – The British Government agrees to allow Singapore its self governance.
- 27 April – The first Pontianak film was released, establishing the horror genre in the local film industry.

=== June ===
- 29 June – By-elections in Tanjong Pagar and Cairnhill constituencies were held, with Lee Kuan Yew winning his seat and Soh Ghee Soon from the Liberal Socialist Party winning the other.

=== July ===
- 1 July – The Berita Harian is launched.

=== August ===
- 4 August – The 4th PAP Party Conference was held. Six left-wing members were elected to the 12-member Central Executive Committee.
- 6 August – Lee Kuan Yew and five other right-wing PAP CEC members does not recognize the results of the 4th Party Conference and refused to resume office.
- 13 August – The PAP left-wing took over key post of the CEC, ending the week old crisis.
- 21–22 August – Chief Minister Lim Yew Hock launched a series of anti-communist mass arrests under the Preservation of Public Security Ordinance known as Operation Apple. About 35 people were detained including the five of the newly elected CEC members and 13 branch officials of the PAP.

=== October ===
- 20 October – A new Central Executive Committee of the PAP is formed with Toh Chin Chye as chairman and Lee Kuan Yew as Secretary-General.

=== November ===
- 1 November – The Citizenship Ordinance in 1957 commenced with registration of Singapore citizenship.
- 3 November – The Workers' Party is formed by David Marshall with the inauguration held at the Hokkien Association Hall at Telok Ayer Street.

=== December ===
- 21 December – The City Council elections was held, with the People's Action Party winning a majority of the seats.
- 24 December – Ong Eng Guan is sworn in as the first Mayor of Singapore.

== Births ==
- 14 January – V. K. Rajah, 8th Attorney-General of Singapore.
- 25 February – Tharman Shanmugaratnam, 9th President of Singapore.
- 13 April – Ellen Lee, former PAP Member of Parliament for Sembawang GRC.
- 2 July – Yam Ah Mee, former brigadier-general and civil servant.
- 1 August – Davinder Singh, lawyer.
- 24 September – Lee Hsien Yang, business executive.
- 3 October – Jacintha Abisheganaden, singer, actress and theater practitioner.
- 15 December – Andrew Phang, judge in the Supreme Court.
- George Quek, founder of BreadTalk.

== Deaths ==
- 1 January – Lim Boon Keng, doctor and reformer (b. 1869).
- 29 January – Tay Koh Yat, Chinese community leader and founder of the Tay Koh Yat Bus Company (b. 1880).
- 2 April – Chew Hock Seng, eldest son of Chew Boon Lay (b. 1883).
- 19 October – Mah Khong, former Chief of Dalforce during the Battle of Singapore (b. 1903).
