= 1966 in Singapore =

- Decades: 1940s; 1950s; 1960s; 1970s; 1980s
- See also: Other events of 1966; Timeline of Singaporean history

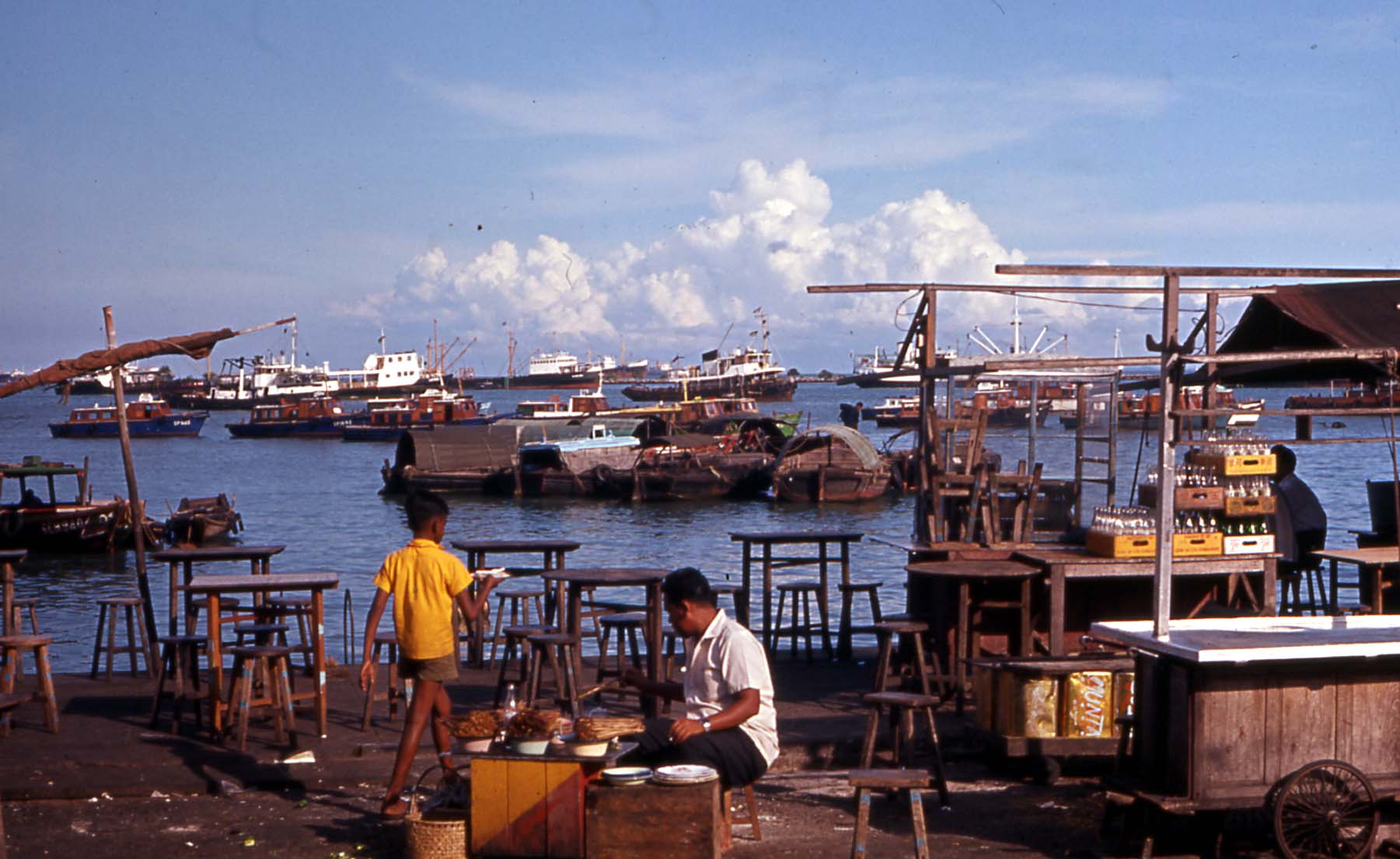

The following lists events that happened during 1966 in Singapore.

- The First National Day parade was held on 9 August 1966 at The Padang

== Incumbents ==
- President: Yusof Ishak
- Prime Minister: Lee Kuan Yew

== Events ==
=== January ===
- 18 January – The Bukit Merah by-election was held. PAP candidate Lim Guan Hoo won by 82.94% of the vote.

=== February ===
- 17 February – The Internal Security Department and Security and Intelligence Division are formed to maintain national security.

=== March ===
- 1 March – By-elections were held in three constituencies, namely Choa Chu Kang Constituency, Crawford Constituency and Paya Lebar Constituency.

=== April ===
- 16 April – Two top Barisan Sosialis leaders and MPs, Chia Thye Poh and Koo Young were arrested on sedition charge.

=== May ===
- 5 May – The National Registration Act comes into effect.
- 9 May – Registration starts for the National Registration Identity Card (NRIC), which comes in laminated plastic.

=== June ===
- 20 June – The first passports are issued.
- 28 June – The "Aid Vietnam Committee" of the Parti Rakyat Singapura and Barisan Sosialis announced that they will be planning a rally on 4 July to protest against the American involvement in the Vietnam War.

=== August ===
- August – The Constitutional Commission Report is issued. Most of the recommendations were not followed except a Council to make sure policies do not discriminate against any racial or religious communities.
- 3 August – Singapore joins the International Monetary Fund (IMF) and the World Bank. This will enable Singapore to borrow loans for development and share best practices in monetary management.
- 9 August – The first National Day Parade is held to commemorate Singapore's independence.
- 12 August – Confrontation ends, after a peace treaty is signed.
- 22 August – Singapore founds the Asian Development Bank as part of 31 nations. It aims to provide another source of funds for development works.
- 23 August – The sea curfew is lifted after the end of Confrontation, a decision widely applauded by villagers.
- 24 August – The National Pledge is recited for the first time, which is written by S. Rajaratnam.
- 26 August – A new TV studio is officially opened for Radio and Television Singapore in Caldecott Hill.

=== October ===
- 8 October – Barisan Sosialis announced the resignation of all of its MPs. Party chairman Lee Siew Choh indicated that the party's new strategy is to struggle outside parliament.
- 29 October – Chia Thye Poh, former Barisan Sosialis MP for Jurong Constituency and other leftists were detained in a security swoop.

=== November ===
- 2 November – The third wave of by-elections were held in three constituencies, namely Bukit Timah Constituency, Jurong Constituency and Joo Chiat Constituency.
- 4 November – A strike which turned into a riot occurred at the City Hall by Ngee Ann College students to protest against the Thong Saw Pak Report. Eight policeman and three civilians were injured in the protest.

=== December ===
- 6 December – Five members from Barisan Sosialis have resigned as Members of Parliament, sparking the 1967 by-elections. They are Tan Cheng Tong (Jalan Kayu), Poh Ber Liak (Tampines), Ong Lian Teng (Bukit Panjang), Loh Miaw Gong (Havelock) and Koo Young (Thomson).

== Births ==
- 8 January – Adrian Pang, Malaysian-born Singaporean actor.
- 4 February – Harpreet Singh Nehal, lawyer and opposition politician.
- 16 March – Fatimah Lateef, former politician.
- 31 March – Adrian Tan, lawyer and author (d. 2023).
- 28 May – Jessica Tan, Deputy Speaker of Parliament.
- 16 June – Hri Kumar Nair, lawyer and former politician.
- 18 October – Aileen Tan, actress.

== Deaths ==
- 25 January – Khoo Kay Hian, broker and founder of UOB-Kay Hian (b. 1886).
- 31 January – Arthur E. Percival, known for surrendering to the Japanese on 15 February 1942 during World War II (b. 1887).
- 9 April – Ko Teck Kin, first High Commissioner to Malaysia (b. 1911).
- 2 June – Richard Olaf Winstedt, colonial administrator (b. 1878).
- 5 June – Lee Choon Seng, Singaporean Chinese businessman and philanthropist (b. 1888).
- 15 November – Roland St John Braddell, lawyer (b. 1880).
