= 1965 in Singapore =

- Decades: 1940s; 1950s; 1960s; 1970s; 1980s
- See also: Other events of 1965; Timeline of Singaporean history

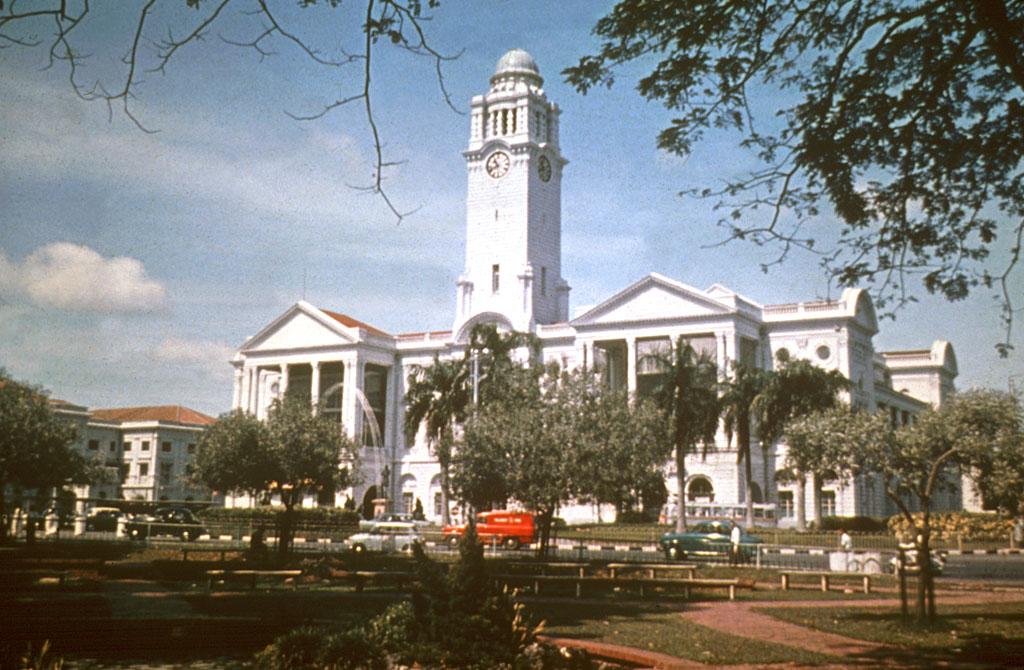
Victoria Theatre and Memorial Hall 1965

The following lists events that happened during 1965 in Singapore.

- Singapore was a part of the Federation of Malaysia until 9 August 1965.

== Incumbents ==
- President: Yusof Ishak (starting 9 August)
- Prime Minister: Lee Kuan Yew (starting 9 August)

== Events ==
=== January ===
- 6 January – The Orchard Theatre (present-day Cathay Cineleisure Orchard) was opened.

=== March ===
- 10 March – Indonesian saboteurs carry out the MacDonald House bombing, killing 3 people.

=== May ===
- 9 May – Lee Kuan Yew begins campaigning for a Malaysian Malaysia. It began with the formation of the Malaysian Solidarity Convention.

=== July ===
- 10 July – A by-election was held in Hong Lim after Ong Eng Guan of the United People's Party resigned. After the vote, Lee Khoon Choy from the People's Action Party was elected into Hong Lim constituency, defeating Ong Chang Sam of the Barisan Sosialis.

=== August ===
- 7 August- The Independence of Singapore Agreement was signed by both Malaysia and Singapore
- 9 August –
  - The Malaysian Parliament votes to expel Singapore from the Federation; Singapore becomes independent after separating from Malaysia.
  - On the same day, the Ministry of Foreign Affairs was established, as well as the Ministry of Interior and Defence.
  - TV Singapura merges with Radio Singapura to form Radio and Television Singapore (RTS).

=== September ===
- 21 September – Singapore is admitted into the United Nations as the 117th member.

=== October ===
- 15 October –
  - Singapore becomes the 22nd member of the Commonwealth.
  - The Singapore Conference Hall is officially opened.

=== November ===
- 27 November – Singapore's first underground carpark is officially opened in Raffles Place, with a public garden built on top.

=== December ===
- 8 December – The first sitting of Parliament commenced. However, MPs from Barisan Sosialis boycotted the first session.
- 14–21 December – Singapore took part in the 3rd South East Asian Peninsular Games. It clinched the third place, accumulating a total of 76 medals.
- 22 December – Constitutional Amendment Act is passed and Yusof bin Ishak becomes the first President of Singapore.
- 23 December – The Singapore Army Act is passed, leading to the formation of the Singapore Army.
- 30 December – The People's Defence Force Act was passed, leading to the formation of the People's Defence Force. This was done to build up the Singapore Army before the introduction of National Service.

== Births ==
- 12 January – Rayson Tan, actor.
- 5 February – Paul Tambyah, 7th Chairman of the Singapore Democratic Party.
- 24 March
  - Gurmit Singh, actor.
  - Yee Jenn Jong, former Workers' Party NCMP.
- 27 March – Eric Khoo, filmmaker.
- 28 March – Sylvia Lim, lawyer and 10th Chairwoman of Workers' Party.
- 19 July – Maliki Osman, assistant professor and former politician.
- 22 August – Chen Liping, actress.
- 10 October – Chen Xiuhuan, actress.
- 22 October – Ang Hin Kee, former PAP MP for Ang Mo Kio GRC.
- 13 November – Yang Libing, actress.
- 30 November – Zainal Sapari, former PAP MP for Pasir Ris–Punggol GRC.

=== Dates unknown ===
- Boey Kim Cheng, poet.
- Elim Chew, founder of 77th Street.
- Felix Cheong, poet.
- Lily Kong, academic.
- Haresh Sharma, resident playwright of The Necessary Stage.
- Joash Moo, novelist, poet and illustrator.

== Deaths ==
- 16 February – Lee Chin Tian, Chinese community leader and businessman (b. 1874).
- 17 March – Mohamed Shariff bin Dollah, former UMNO city councillor for Tanglin Constituency (b. 1912).
- 27 March – Teo Hang Sam, former President of Ngee Ann Kongsi and Teochew Poit Ip Huay Kuan (b. 1897).
- 15 May – Edgeworth David, last Chief Secretary of Singapore (b. 1908).
- 11 October – George Lee Geok Eng, businessman and newspaper publisher (b. 1897).
- 26 November – Hafeezudin Sirajuddin Moonshi, prominent doctor and former municipal commissioner (b. 1895).
