= Awang Bakar =

Singaporean footballer

Awang bin Bakar (died 1 July 1964) was a Singaporean football footballer who played as a striker.

== Career ==
Awang played for the Singapore national football team.

== Personal life ==
Awang died on 1 July 1964 after a fall during a match between his Changi Malays team and a RAF team.
