= Yang di-Pertuan Negara =

Head of state in Malay-speaking countries

Yang di-Pertuan Negara (English: (he) who is Lord of the State) is a title for the head of state in certain Malay-speaking countries, and has been used as an official title at various times in Brunei and Singapore.

== Sabah ==
The head of state of Sabah was once known as Yang Di-Pertua Negara and later known as Yang Di-Pertua Negeri.

== Sarawak ==
The head of state of Sarawak was once known as Yang Di-Pertua Negara and later known as Yang Di-Pertua Negeri.

== Singapore ==
The title for the head of the State of Singapore from 1959 to 1965.

== Brunei ==
In Brunei, the Sultan of Brunei is also known as the Yang Di-Pertuan Negara Brunei Darussalam.

The full title for the head of state and head of government of Brunei is Kebawah Duli Yang Maha Mulia Paduka Seri Baginda Sultan dan Yang Di-Pertuan Negara Brunei Darussalam.

== See also ==
- Bendahara
