= 2024 in Singapore =

- Decades: 2000s; 2010s; 2020s
- See also: Other events of 2024; Timeline of Singaporean history

The following lists events that happened during 2024 in the Republic of Singapore.

== Incumbents ==
- President: Tharman Shanmugaratnam
- Prime Minister: Lee Hsien Loong (until 14 May), Lawrence Wong (from 15 May)

== Events ==
=== January ===
- 1 January – The Goods and Services Tax is raised from 8 to 9 per cent.
- 5 January – Four telecommunications companies offer international call blocking services in an attempt to deter scams.
- 9 January – The Land Transport Authority (LTA) announces that EZ-Link cards not upgraded to SimplyGo, as well as NETS FlashPay cards, will be deprecated on 1 June 2024.
- 12 January – The Central Public Library at the National Library Building at Victoria Street is officially reopened with a marine-themed children's section sponsored by S.E.A. Aquarium (which will be reopened as Singapore Oceanarium later in the year) and National Library Board. The library also has an AI-inspired storyline booth and areas paying tribute to Singapore's history and culture.
- 18 January – S. Iswaran resigns as Minister for Transport, Member of Parliament (MP) for West Coast Group Representation Constituency, and a member of the governing People's Action Party (PAP) after receiving 27 charges regarding bribery and corruption by the Corrupt Practices Investigation Bureau. Chee Hong Tat succeeds him as transport minister, and Grace Fu succeeds him as Minister-in-Charge of Trade Relations.
- 22 January –
  - Transport minister Chee Hong Tat reverses a prior decision to deprecate EZ-Link cards without SimplyGo and NETS FlashPay cards after 1 June, pledging S$40 million to extend the system's lifespan.
  - The first Total Defence Day Exercise is announced, simulating disruptions to power and food supplies to commemorate 40 years since the launch of Total Defence.
- 29 January – Cosford Container Park opens.

=== February ===
- 20–25 February – The ninth edition of the Singapore Airshow was held at Changi Exhibition Centre.

=== March ===
- 2–4 and 7–9 March – Taylor Swift's The Eras Tour is held at the National Stadium, marking Singapore as the tour's exclusive stop in Southeast Asia due to a grant given by the Singapore Tourism Board. The event is estimated to have generated S$500 million in tourism revenue, while the status of an exclusive stop causes a diplomatic crisis between Singapore and other Southeast Asian countries.
- 14 March – The Sentosa Sensoryscape is opened.
- 19 March – Pritam Singh, the secretary-general of the Workers' Party (WP), is charged with two counts of perjury for his behaviour in the Committee of Privileges' hearing against ex-WP MP Raeesah Khan; vice-chairperson Faisal Manap receives a police advisory for his own behaviour during the hearing.
- 25 March – S. Iswaran receives eight new charges for corruption, which accuse him of accepting alcohol, a Brompton bicycle, and golf clubs from a Lum Kok Seng.

=== April ===
- 2 April – Joseph Schooling, who won Singapore's first ever Olympic gold medal, retires from swimming at 28.
- 15 April – Lee Hsien Loong announces his resignation as the Prime Minister of Singapore effective 15 May 2024, paving the way for the assumption of Deputy Prime Minister and Finance Minister Lawrence Wong as the next Prime Minister.
- 15 April – Kallang Tennis Hub is opened to the public.
- 16 April – Lawrence Wong says that Lee Hsien Loong will remain in the Cabinet as Senior Minister and that there will be a new Cabinet without major changes before his term starts.
- 19 April – The police issue warnings about a blackmail scheme, with over 70 people reporting the receipt of letters demanding payment and attached with fake compromising photos of themselves. It was disclosed one day later that three politicians were also targeted.
- 22 April – The new Rail Corridor at Buona Vista is officially opened with a large new playgrounds and exercise corners along the area of one north, aside from the Rail Corridor at Bukit Timah Railway Station.

=== May ===
- 8 May – An F-16 crashes in Tengah Air Base, with the pilot surviving the impact after ejection.
- 9 May – Minister for National Development Desmond Lee announces plans to set up a second Marine Park on Kusu Island and Lazarus Island to safeguard the marine environment.
- 13 May – Lawrence Wong unveils his new Cabinet, with Gan Kim Yong to be Deputy Prime Minister, as well as several promotions and two new ministerial appointees. The Ministry of Communications and Information is announced to be renamed the Ministry of Digital Development and Information (MDDI) from 8 July.
- 15 May – Lawrence Wong is sworn in as the fourth Prime Minister of Singapore, succeeding Lee Hsien Loong.
- 16 May – Singapore Civil Defence Force (SCDF) officer Kenneth Tay Xue Qin dies after a fire breaks out on a tanker ship.
- 21 May – Singapore Airlines Flight 321, a Singapore Airlines flight from London to Singapore, makes an emergency landing at Bangkok's Suvarnabhumi Airport after experiencing severe air turbulence over the Bay of Bengal, resulting in one death and at least 71 injured.

=== June ===
- 4 June – LTA enforcement officer Zdulfika Ahakasah dies after crashing his motorcycle into a road divider whilst chasing a suspect.
- 14 June – An accident involving a Dutch-flagged dredger and a stationary Singapore-flagged bunker vessel occurs at the Pasir Panjang terminal, causing an oil spill that forces the closure of three beaches on the offshore island of Sentosa.
- 23 June – The fourth stage of the Thomson–East Coast Line, comprising Mass Rapid Transit (MRT) stations between Tanjong Rhu and Bayshore, officially opens for service.

=== July ===
- 19 July – Thirty-six people are rescued after fires break out on board the São Tomé and Príncipe-flagged tanker Ceres I and Singapore-flagged tanker Hafnia Nile following a collision near Pedra Branca. The remaining 26 Ceres I crew members remain on board to conduct fire-fighting operations.
- 21 July – The Tengah Bus Interchange is opened.
- 30 July – 60 employees of ByteDance are sickened following an outbreak of gastroenteritis at the company's offices in the Central Business District that is blamed on suspected food poisoning. The number increases to 130 the next day, with two caterers present that day having their operations suspended.

=== August ===
- 4–5 August – The Ministry of Education removes Mobile Guardian, a mobile device management system, from all iPads and Chromebooks used by Singaporean secondary students for online learning after 13,000 students were affected by a global security breach involving Mobile Guardian.
- 7 August – The Good Samaritan Food Donation Bill, tabled by MP Louis Ng, is passed to protect donors from criminal or civil liability for any death or personal injury resulting from consuming donated food, provided certain conditions to ensure food safety and hygiene are met.
- 9 August – Kitefoiler Maximilian Maeder wins bronze at the Paris 2024 Olympics, the only medal won by Singapore at the 2024 Olympics.
- 15 August – Teck Lee LRT station on the Punggol LRT line opens 19 years after the line first started.
- 18 August – At the National Day Rally, Prime Minister Lawrence Wong announces several policy initiatives, including Singapore's first-ever unemployment support scheme, a revamp of the Gifted Education Programme, enhanced shared parental leave entitlements, and increased support for build-to-order flat applicants - with more priority given to singles and additional grants for low-income households. He also unveils plans for Sports Hub's future development, featuring a new 18,000-seat indoor stadium, pedestrianised roads, a community boulevard, and the consolidation of sport facilities, such as the integration of Singapore Sports School and training centres for national athletes.
- 29 August – The Urban Redevelopment Authority grants GMC Property permission to add four storeys to the conserved Golden Mile Complex and to construct a 45-storey condominium tower next to the original building.

=== September ===
- 1 September –
  - The Jurong West Bus Package operations is handed over to SMRT Corporation from SBS Transit spanning Boon Lay Bus Interchanges.
  - Residents of public apartments are allowed to keep cats, subject to certain conditions, after the prior ban on doing so is rescinded.
- 5 September – Woodleigh Village Hawker Centre, in the Bidadari housing estate, opens.
- 8 September – One Punggol is officially opened as the second integrated lifestyle community hub in Singapore.
- 9 September – The Energy Transition Measures and Other Amendments Bill is passed, giving Energy Market Authority the authority to ration power during emergencies, as well as setting up a fund to support the city-state's clean energy transition, with an initial injection of S$5 billion.
- 11–13 September – Pope Francis visits Singapore, the second time a pope has visited the country since Pope John Paul II in 1986.
- 15 September – The operations of the Jurong West Bus Package, spanning Joo Koon Bus Interchange, Tuas Bus Terminal and Soon Lee Bus Depot, are handed over to SMRT Corporation from SBS Transit.
- 24 September –
  - S. Iswaran pleads guilty to receiving S$403,000 in gifts while he was transport minister.
  - Twelve Singapore Armed Forces servicemen sustain minor injuries when an armoured vehicle rear-ends another during a military exercise in the Shoalwater Bay Military Training Area near Rockhampton, Queensland in Australia.
- 25 September – Train services on the East–West Line (EWL) are disrupted when a faulty Kawasaki C151 train causes a power trip and damaged the track and equipment along the stretch between the Clementi and Dover stations. This results in the suspension of regular services between the Boon Lay and Queenstown stations. Services fully resume on 1 October.
- 30 September – Passport-less clearance is fully implemented in all four terminals of Changi Airport. Arriving and departing Singapore residents, and departing foreign visitors, can clear immigration by using facial and iris biometrics.

=== October ===
- 3 October – S. Iswaran is sentenced to a year of imprisonment for receiving illegal gifts.
- 5 October –
  - After 181 years, the Singapore Turf Club holds its final race.
  - A Spanish couple is arrested at Changi Airport on suspicion of breaking public assembly and vandalism laws by staging protests against Valencia CF owner Peter Lim.
- 9 October – Lee Wei Ling, the daughter of the first Prime Minister of Singapore, Lee Kuan Yew, dies at 69.
- 14 October – The Government blocks the sale of Income Insurance's stake to Allianz as it was assessed not to be in the public interest. Insurance laws are subsequently tightened to scrutinise transactions involving insurance cooperatives or other organisations with a history of being one.
- 15 October – The Elections (Integrity of Online Advertising) (Amendment) Bill is passed, prohibiting the publication of deepfakes that realistically depict an electoral candidate saying or doing something that they did not say or do.
- 18 October – K. Shanmugam, Minister for Law and Home Affairs confirms that a 17-year-old youth has been arrested under the Internal Security Act for planning to attack non-Muslims in Tampines.
- 20 October – An oil leak from a land-based pipeline belonging to Shell between Bukom Island and Bukom Kecil affects waters off Singapore.
- 22 October –
  - Lee Hsien Yang, the youngest son of Lee Kuan Yew, says in a Facebook post that he was granted political asylum in the United Kingdom after seeking asylum protection there in 2022.
  - The Energy Market Authority announces that it has granted conditional approval to Sun Cable to import 1.75 GW of low-carbon electricity from Australia's Northern Territory to Singapore. The project is expected to come online after 2035.
  - The Ministry of Education (MOE) announces that construction of the Goh Keng Swee Centre for Education will start in 2025, with completion by 2029. The 30-storey Centre was first announced by then-Prime Minister Lee Hsien Loong at the 2010 National Day Rally, and seeks to consolidate all of MOE's training facilities into a single location, allowing for synergies between different departments and freeing up land for other uses. The MOE Heritage Centre will also be relocated to this complex.
- 27 October – Singapore wins the 2024 Asian Netball Championship, defeating reigning champion Sri Lanka.
- 28 October –
  - Sisters' Islands Marine Park reopens to the public after three years of rejuvenation works.
  - An oil spill takes place off Changi during a bunkering operation between a Bahamas-flagged bulk carrier and a licensed bunker tanker.
- 29 October – Chinese state-owned plane manufacturer COMAC opens an office in Singapore.
- 30 October – Five Singapore-based firms are sanctioned by the US for enabling Russian efforts in its invasion of Ukraine.

=== November ===
- 2 November – The Early Childhood Development Agency announces that it will work with five anchor operators to open up nearly 40,000 new infant and childcare places from 2025 to 2029.
- 4 November – The film Small Hours of the Night, inspired by Tan Chay Wa's tombstone trial, is denied classification by the Infocomm Media Development Authority (IMDA), and is hence barred from public screenings during the upcoming 2024 Singapore International Film Festival.
- 9 November – A parish priest is stabbed by a Sinhalese man at Saint Joseph's Church during a communion.
- 11 November –
  - The Ministry of Health and the Singapore Medical Council announces that Singapore will recognise nine additional medical schools in Australia, the United Kingdom, and Ireland.
  - Singapore's first biennial transparency report, submitted to the UN before the 2024 United Nations Climate Change Conference, projects the country's emissions will peak at 64.43 million tonnes in 2028.
- 12 November – The Community Disputes Resolution (Amendment) Bill is passed, setting up a new government unit, the Community Relations Unit (CRU), to tackle severe noise and hoarding cases.
- 13 November –
  - The expanded Shoalwater Bay Military Training Area, jointly developed by Singapore and Australia for training conducted by SAF and ADF, is officially opened.
  - Parliament passes amendments to the Child Development Co-Savings Act, extending government-paid parental leave by an additional 10 weeks, bringing the total to 30 weeks by April 1, 2026.
- 15 November
  - Resorts World Sentosa starts construction on their new waterfront attractions, with completion by 2030. It will consist of a 88-metre tall light sculpture, two new luxury hotels and a podium with new shops to be set up.
  - The Singapore Civil Defence Force starts construction of their Marine Division headquarters on Pulau Brani, which will be completed by March 2026. Plans to boost the Division's capabilities are also announced, with an increase from six firefighting vessels to 10 by 2029, and from four to six marine bases by 2035.
- 16 November –
  - Prime Minister Lawrence Wong announces that Singapore has offered to host the 2030 APEC Summit.
  - Heavy rain causes a flash flood along Bukit Timah Road.
- 17 November – Heavy rain causes a flash flood along Ophir Road.
- 18 November –
  - Hin Leong founder Lim Oon Kuin is sentenced to seventeen years and six months of jail for three charges of fraud and forgery.
  - The Gambling Regulatory Authority renews the casino licence of Resorts World Sentosa for two years, instead of the usual three years, citing unsatisfactory tourism performance during the three-year period between 2021 and 2023.
  - The police announced that 15 suspects involved in the S$3 billion money-laundering case that fled earlier have agreed to surrender about S$1.85 billion in assets and be banned from returning to Singapore. Two other suspects remain under investigation.
- 21 November – The police and the SAF remove an unexploded World War II bomb from Keppel Club.
- 22 November –
  - Heavy rain causes two flash floods at Yishun Avenue 7 in Yishun and Wan Tho Avenue in Potong Pasir.
  - The Institute of Mental Health launches a ten-year study funded by Temasek Foundation to track the mental well-being of local youth born between 2007 and 2016.
- 23 November – Travellers crossing the Woodlands Checkpoint and Tuas Checkpoint by bus are now able to clear immigration using QR codes.
- 24 November – The PAP elects its 38th central executive committee.
- 25 November–12 December – The World Chess Championship 2024 is held in Singapore.
- 25 November – The Ministry of Sustainability and the Environment announces that, as a measure to contain dengue, the release of Wolbachia-carrying male mosquitoes will reach 50% of households by 2026.
- 28 November –
  - A joint venture between SBS Transit and RATP Dev Asia Pacific is appointed the operator of the Jurong Region Line for an initial nine years, with a further two-year option. This marks the first introduction of a foreign operator to Singapore's local rail industry. The operator for the Cross Island Line is slated to be decided at a later date.
  - The MDDI says in a statement that since 26 November, more than 100 civil servants from 31 government agencies, including 12 political office-holders, had received extortionary e-mail containing fake compromising photos of themselves. This comes after the Ministry of Health reported that staff from public healthcare institutions had been receiving similar e-mails.

=== December ===
- 1 December –
  - Buangkok Bus Interchange opens.
  - The Early Childhood Development Agency launches a three-year pilot program to allow three operators to provide home-based childminding service.
- 2 December – The Monetary Authority of Singapore (MAS) imposes a S$2.4 million civil penalty on JPMorgan Chase over misconduct by its relationship managers.
- 4 December – The kebaya is recognised as part of UNESCO's Intangible Heritage list, in collaboration with Malaysia, Indonesia, Thailand and Brunei.
- 10 December – Punggol Coast MRT station, which is on the North East Line and situated outside the Punggol campus of the Singapore Institute of Technology, is opened.
- 14 December – The government announces that it intends to change the practice of masking NRIC numbers in response to concerns that the new Bizfile governmental portal showed personal details in its search results.
- 16 December – The Shared Responsibility Framework, announced by MAS and IMDA, are implemented. The framework assigns financial institutions and telecommunication companies relevant duties to mitigate phishing scams, and sets expectations of payouts to scam victims where these duties are breached.
- 17 December – Real estate and healthcare firm Perennial Holdings becomes the first foreign company to wholly own a private tertiary general hospital in China, after its hospital in Tianjin city was given approval by Chinese authorities.
- 23 December – Singapore Post terminates its group chief executive, group chief financial officier and chief executive of its international business unit, citing "grossly negligent behaviour in their handling of internal investigations".
- 31 December –
  - Commemorations for SG60 begin.
  - Ridership on Singapore's MRT and LRT lines in 2024 surpasses pre-COVID-19 levels for the first time.

== Deaths ==
- 6 January – Ho Weng Toh, pioneer Singapore Airlines and former Flying Tigers pilot. (b. 1920).
- 12 January – Thean Lip Ping, former judge of the Court of Appeal (b. 1933).
- 16 January – Ajit Singh Gill, Singapore's oldest Olympian. (b. 1928).
- 3 February – Wee Cho Yaw, billionaire and United Overseas Bank's longest serving chairman (b. 1929).
- 14 February – Tan Kue Kim, chef and restaurateur (b. 1945/1946).
- 27 February – Suratman Markasan, Singaporean novelist of Javanese descent (b. 1930).
- 28 February – Ahmed Salim, convicted murderer who was executed in Singapore for murdering his Indonesian lover Nurhidayati Wartono Surata in 2018. He was also the first death row offender to be executed for murder in Singapore since 2019. (b. 1989)
- 1 March – Ch'ng Jit Koon, former Senior Minister of State for Community Development and former PAP Member of Parliament for Tiong Bahru Constituency and Bukit Merah SMC (b. 1934).
- 2 March – Eugene Wijeysingha, former Raffles Institution headmaster and historian (b. 1934).
- 5 April – Ng Suan Loi, actress (I Not Stupid Too) (b. 1936).
- 7 April – Wong Liang Hun, fencer (b. 1953).
- 25 April – Tariq Helou, chef (known as Asia's “Most Googled Chef” in 2024) (b. 1995)
- 28 April – Robin Chua Yang Kwang, former SAF Colonel from HQ Singapore Artillery (b. 1981).
- 8 May – Liew Kok Pun, former PAP Member of Parliament for Boon Teck Constituency (b. 1944).
- 16 May – Captain Tay Xue Jin Kenneth, SCDF fireman who died while extinguishing flames on board the Chinese registered container vessel along Singapore Straits (b. 1993/1994).
- 27 May – Alan Choe, pioneer urban planner and founder of the Urban Redevelopment Authority (b. 1931).
- 29 May – Lim Ee Ping, Workers' Party veteran (b. 1939).
- 30 May – Yang Quee Yee, renowned and influential Malay language scholar and lexicographer in Singapore and Malaysia (b. 1931).
- 4 June – Cheo Chai Chen, former SDP Member of Parliament for Nee Soon Central SMC (b. 1951).
- 13 June – Leong Chee Chiew, National Parks Board's commissioner of parks and recreation (b. 1951/1952).
- 18 June – S. Rajendran, former Supreme Court Judge and former Chairman of the Hindu Endowments Board (b. 1938).
- 24 June – Mohammad Maidin Packer Mohd, former Senior Parliamentary Secretary to the Ministry of Home Affairs and former PAP Member of Parliament for Aljunied GRC and Marine Parade GRC (b. 1957).
- 6 July – Paul Cheong, veteran musician and former radio presenter for Rediffusion (b. 1949).
- 18 July – Pathmanaban Selvadurai, lawyer and former PAP Member of Parliament for Bukit Panjang Constituency and Kuo Chuan Constituency (b. 1933).
- 21 July – Ang Boon Ee, chef (b. 1958).
- 30 July – Asiah Aman, singer and actress (b. 1931).
- 13 August – Charis Eng, Singaporean American physician-scientist (b. 1962).
- 21 August – Jeremy Pei, illusionist and stuntman (b. 1983).
- 2 October – Lim Chin Joo, former Chairman of Ee Hoe Hean Club, student movement leader in the 1950s and 60s and younger brother of Barisan Sosialis Secretary-General Lim Chin Siong (b. 1937).
- 9 October – Lee Wei Ling, former chief and director at National Neuroscience Institute, younger sister of Senior Minister & former Prime Minister Lee Hsien Loong and Lee Hsien Yang, only daughter of 1st Prime Minister Lee Kuan Yew (b. 1955).
- 12 October – Asokan S/O Muniyandy, performer known for impersonating Indian actor Sivaji Ganesan (b. 1964).
- 14 October – Shahid Nasheer, theatre actor (b. 1996).
- 19 October – Chan Tuck Cheong, founder of the famed ‘Fatty Cheong’ roast meat hawker at/from ABC Brickworks Market and Bukit Merah Food Centre (b. 1967).
- 24 October – Raffi Khan, actor (b. 1963).
- 28 October – Looi San Cheng, founder of famous and successful Tip Top Curry Puff (b. 1944).
- 29 October – Rahmat Mawar, footballer (b. 1942).
- 16 November – S. Atan, Singapore-born Malaysian composer, lyricist, and producer (b. 1949).
- 27 November – Syed Haroon Mohamed Aljunied, former Secretary of Majlis Ugama Islam Singapura (b. 1947).
- 3 December – Tan Howe Liang, weightlifter and Singapore's first Olympic medalist (b. 1933).
- 17 December – Nicholas Chia, 3rd Archbishop of Singapore (b. 1938).
