= 2022 in Singapore =

- Decades: 2000s; 2010s; 2020s
- See also: Other events of 2022; Timeline of Singaporean history

The following lists events that happened during 2022 in the Republic of Singapore.

== Incumbents ==
- President: Halimah Yacob
- Prime Minister: Lee Hsien Loong

== Events ==
Below, events for the COVID-19 pandemic in Singapore have the "CP" prefix.

=== January ===
- 1 January –
  - Voco Singapore Orchard Hotel is officially opened.
  - Enforcement of mandatory tray return at foodcourts and coffeeshops under Singapore's Environmental Public Health Act officially began.
  - New rules capping cycling groups at 5 cyclists in single file or 10 cyclists in 2-abreast when on the roads take effect.
- 6 January – NTUC Income plans to convert from a cooperative to a company called Income Insurance Ltd to better compete in the insurance industry. The conversion is completed on 1 September.
- 11 January – Filmgarde Cineplexes announced it will shut two of its cinemas at Bugis+ and Century Square by March. Plans for its Leisure Park Kallang outlet and other business initiatives will be released in future.
- 12 January – Stage 6 of the Circle MRT line will now be completed by 2026, a year later than earlier announced.
- 14 January –
  - The Ministry of Sustainability and the Environment announces the issuance of recycling bins to every household to increase domestic recycling rates.
  - Singapore Art Museum has launched its new space for Arts Exhibitions at Tanjong Pagar Distripark.
- 20 January – CP: Singapore reported its first Omicron-related death, a 92-year-old unvaccinated woman.
- 21 January – Northshore Plaza ll is officially opened as the seafront shopping mall with Singapore's fifth A&W fast food outlet.
- 24 January – Outram Community Hospital is officially opened.
- 27 January – The Singapore Grand Prix is renewed for an additional seven years through 2028. The race will also be made sustainable too with a sustainability audit undertaken.
- 30 January –
  - In PM Lee Hsien Loong's Chinese New Year Message 2022, he called on more Singaporeans to get married and have children in the Year of the Tiger, and get children and seniors to be vaccinated against COVID-19 as soon as possible.
  - Changi Bay Point Park Connector is officially opened to the public, connecting Changi Beach Park, Changi Airport and East Coast Park.
- 31 January – CP: Pfizer's Paxlovid has been approved by the Health Sciences Authority as the first COVID-19 treatment tablet for use in Singapore. The approval is announced four days later.

=== February ===
- 7 February – A new initiative Find Your Way was launched at Toa Payoh Bus Interchange. The bus interchange is split into zones, with depictions of childhood items plastered on the walls of each zone to serve as a visible guide for people with dementia. There are plans to extend this initiative to other bus interchanges and MRT stations progressively.
- 9 February – The CapitaSpring Tower at Market Street is opened with Green Oasis, Sky Gardens and a hawker centre.
- 12 February – GR.ID mall (formerly POMO) at Selegie is officially opened after having its soft launch in October 2021.
- 14 February – CP: The Novavax COVID-19 vaccine is approved by the Health Sciences Authority for use as a protein-based subunit vaccine in Singapore.
- 18 February – The Government announces that the GST would be increased in two stages; to 8% on 1 January 2023 and 9% on 1 January 2024.
- 21 February – The first two Alstom Movia R151 trainsets serving the North South and East West MRT lines arrive in Singapore.
- 23 February – Singtel announces plans to redevelop Comcentre from 2024 into a building featuring the latest digital technologies and sustainable features. The building will be ready by 2028, being well integrated into the surroundings and having underground connections. More details were unveiled on 1 June, with Lendlease chosen to develop the new complex comprising two 20-storey buildings with a wide atrium and several dining and retail options including Singtel's new flagship store, as well as an elevated rooftop park with a 300-person auditorium, running and walking tracks and an integrated wellness hub.
- 24 February – Hilton Singapore Orchard Hotel is officially opened after it being previously occupied by Mandarin Orchard Hotel.

=== March ===
- 9 March – Plans are announced for a new Healthier SG strategy that puts preventive healthcare as a priority. It will have patients use family doctors as a first touch point. A white paper on the issue will be out later this year.
- 10 March –
  - The Ministry of Social and Family Development declares 2022 as the "Year of Celebrating SG Families", with a strategy to be drafted later this year.
  - Giant panda cub Le Le joins his mother Jia Jia in the main exhibit at River Wonders with the information board unveiled.
- 11 March – The first Alstom Metropolis C851E trainset serving the Circle Line arrive in Singapore.
- 14 March – CP: Booster shots are extended to those aged 12 to 17.
- 15 March – A proposed attraction at Jurong Lake District will now be completed by 2028, with concepts based on technology, edutainment and sustainability.
- 17 March – Singapore announced a bid to host the 2025 World Athletics Championships under Singapore25. The event will be the first one in Southeast Asia if successful.
- 18 March – Tan Tock Seng Hospital has officially opened its Specialist Centre at Ang Mo Kio Central.
- 22 March – Defence Minister Ng Eng Hen announced that this year's National Day Parade will be held at The Float @ Marina Bay due to a delay in constructing NS Square caused by the COVID-19 pandemic. The facility will only start construction in 2023 with completion in 2026.
- 24 March –
  - CP: Several relaxations are announced by the government, including lifting mask-wearing requirements outdoors; increasing group sizes from 5 to 10, allowing 75% of workers in workplaces, relaxation of travel restrictions for vaccinated people through the Vaccinated Travel Framework and increased event sizes up to 75% of a venue for events with more than 1,000 people. The rules will take effect on 29 March and 1 April, for the domestic and travel ones respectively.
  - CP: For education institutions, events like the National School Games have resumed, with more to come like the Singapore Youth Festival. Gradual relaxation of rules in learning will be done, with masking relaxed for those with higher support needs for language and literacy lessons, as well as re-establishing connections with overseas peers and schools.
  - CP: In dining areas, a ban on alcohol consumption in dining areas after 10:30pm will be lifted, along with live performances and broadcast programmes. Outdoor live performances and busking will also be allowed, along with singing so long as masks are worn.
- 28 March – The White Paper on Singapore Women's Development is released, setting out a 10-year plan with a mid-term review in 2027. It proposes 25 strategies, among them are new anti-discrimination laws, new Tripartite Guidelines on Flexible Work Arrangements by 2024 with increased adoption of flexible work arrangements to 40 percent by end-2022, allowing egg freezing for women aged 21 to 35 from early 2023 with egg usage only allowed in marriages, increasing Home Caregiving Grant to $250 and $400, expanded Household Services Scheme for elder-minding and other services, childminding pilots, better caregiving resources and support networks, protection from harms, expanding the National Anti-Violence Hotline to handle sexual harassment cases from 1 May (thereby renamed to National Anti-Violence and Sexual Harassment Hotline) with new reporting modes, a new safe sports code, new gender-sensitive standards, teaching body safety to pre-schoolers and equality in schools, as well as a new park in Dhoby Ghaut Green dedicated to women.
- 31 March –
  - The first Japanese retail furniture store Nitori in Singapore is opened at Courts Nojima at The Heeren at Level 4.
  - CP: Singapore suspended the dedicated COVID-19 vaccination channels for overseas Singaporeans.

=== April ===
- 1 April – Siglap Community Club has its soft launch with McDonald's and Sheng Siong.
- 14 April – Minister for Finance Lawrence Wong is chosen as leader of the People's Action Party's fourth-generation (4G) team.
- 15 April – Singapore Flyer resumed flight operations after suspending it in January 2022 for repairs and rectification works.
- 26 April – CP: The Disease Outbreak Response System Condition (DORSCON) level is lowered from Orange to Yellow.

=== May ===
- 1 May – Hougang RiverCourt is opened as a shopping mall in Hougang.
- 7 May – Kallang Polyclinic is officially opened. The polyclinic is co-located within a hospital, and has an automated vaccine management system, health facilities, a patient advisory council and a maternal and child unit.
- 8 May – The Immigration and Checkpoints Authority announces the issuance of digital birth and death certificates in place of physical certificates starting 29 May.
- 9 May – New enlistees undergoing National Service will no longer need to surrender their NRICs from 15 May, with those serving to have their NRICs returned by November.
- 12 May to 23 May – Team Singapore Athletes participate in the 31st South East Asian Games 2021 in Hanoi, Vietnam.
- 19 May – Taxi surcharges from Changi Airport are raised by S$3 until 30 June. Certain taxi companies would later opt to extend the surcharge hike until the end of the year. The hike was later extended to 30 June 2023.
- 26 May – A further expansion of Woodlands Checkpoint is announced to cater for future traffic growth and security situations; with enhancements for all vehicle types, introducing flexi-lanes for cars and motorcycles, providing adequate holding areas for traffic and having security checks away from the main checkpoint towards a more upfront area. The areas will cover nine HDB blocks in Marsiling, with replacement flats being built in Woodlands.
- 29 May – The new underground linkway between the East West Line and North East Line at Outram Park MRT station is officially opened.
- 30 May – The first Bombardier Innovia APM 300 trainset serving the Bukit Panjang LRT line arrives in Singapore.

=== June ===
- 1 June – The new Fairprice outlet at Causeway Point under the 'Fairprice Finest' label is officially opened.
- 6 June –
  - Eunos Polyclinic is officially opened.
  - As part of a Cabinet reshuffle, Minister for Finance Lawrence Wong is promoted to Deputy Prime Minister of Singapore, hence serving with Heng Swee Keat. The move took effect on 13 June.
- 13 June – Firefly resumes commercial flights into and out of Seletar Airport, the first time since such operations were suspended due to the COVID-19 pandemic.
- 18 June – The 14th edition of Pink Dot SG is held at Hong Lim Park. It is the first event where Members of Parliament are spotted among the attendees, being Henry Kwek from PAP and Jamus Lim from WP.
- 23 June – i12 Katong shopping centre is officially reopened.
- 26 June – Cathay Cineplexes ceases operations at The Cathay.
- 28 June – Deputy Prime Minister Lawrence Wong announces a year-long review of Singapore's social compact, titled "Forward Singapore". It will review policies in six key areas, namely "Empower", "Equip", "Care", "Build", "Steward" and "Unite". A report detailing a ten-year plan will be out by mid-2023.

=== July ===
- 1 July –
  - Smoking is prohibited at all beaches, parks, gardens and water sites with enforcement action taking effect on 1 October.
  - Bukit Timah railway station reopened as part of the new 4.3-hectare community space around the mid-point of the Rail Corridor.
- 7 July – Decathlon Data Lab in Singapore is launched for digitalisation computer service operated by Decathlon and Sports Singapore which is located next to its Singapore Lab store in Stadium Boulevard.
- 18 July – DBS Newton Green, the new first net zero bank building at Bukit Timah Road is officially opened and managed by DBS Bank.
- 24 July – Northshore Plaza l and ll, HDB's first Sea front-facing shopping mall in Punggol is officially opened.
- 25 July – The Fernvale Community Club and Hawker Centre that is located next to Seletar Mall is officially opened, and managed by Kopitiam.
- 30 July – The Rivervale Community Club that is located next to Rivervale Plaza is officially opened.

=== August ===
- 1 August – The Gambling Regulatory Authority is formed to regulate all forms of gambling in Singapore, expanding from the previous Casino Regulatory Authority. This is accompanied by reforms to gambling laws, with new forms of licences and legalisation of social gambling at homes.
- 3 August – Plans are revealed to redevelop AXA Tower into Singapore's tallest building at 305 metres tall, being approved made by the Urban Redevelopment Authority on 7 July. Developed by a consortium led by Alibaba and Perennial Holdings, the mixed-use development will be completed by 2028.
- 6 August – The new Siglap Community Club is officially opened by Deputy Prime Minister Heng Swee Kiat with features of a bowling alley, a big basketball court, a Sheng Siong supermart, McDonald's, and Kopitiam Corner foodcourt.
- 21 August – Prime Minister Lee Hsien Loong announced during the annual Singapore National Day Rally that the Singapore Government will be repealing Section 377A of Singapore's penal code that criminalised sex between men. At the same time, he also announced that the government will be amending the constitution to enshrine the definition of marriage as only being between a man and a woman. By extension, policies on advertising and film classification, education, public housing and adoption will remain unchanged.
- 29 August – CP: After nearly 2 years, the government lifts mask-wearing requirements indoors; commuters on public transportation and those in healthcare settings are still required to wear masks.
- 30 August – Swimmers Joseph Schooling and Amanda Lim admit to cannabis use overseas. As a result, Schooling was issued a formal warning letter, placed under a six-month testing regime and banned from competitions while in National Service, with Amanda issued a stern warning. Sport Singapore, as well as the Singapore National Olympic Council and the Singapore Swimming Association have also planned further action based on investigations.
- 31 August – GXS Bank, a consortium by Grab and Singtel, is launched Singapore's first digital bank for consumers and businesses. Its first product is a savings account with daily interest without requiring a minimum deposit. The app will begin operations on 5 September.

=== September ===
- 1 September –
  - The Tuas Megaport is officially opened with the first three berths running.
  - The rebranding exercise from NTUC Income to Income Insurance Limited is officially completed and relaunched.
  - Trust Bank is launched as a digital bank, being a partnership between Standard Chartered Bank and FairPrice Group.
- 13 September – CP: Changi Airport Terminal 4 is reopened after two years of travel restrictions caused by the COVID-19 pandemic.
- 15 September – The Central Beach Bazaar near Beach Station at Sentosa located at Siloso Beach is officially opened.
- 20 September – Phase 2 of the Cross Island Line is announced.
- 21 September – A white paper on the proposed Healthier SG initiative is released.
- 30 September to 2 October – The Singapore Grand Prix takes place after a 2-year hiatus.

=== October ===
- 9 October – One Punggol is opened featuring a Community Club, Basketball Court, BBQ Pit, and several healthcare facilities.
- 11 October – Changi Airport Terminal 2 southern wing resumes flight operations after a two-year hiatus.
- 12 October – The Singtel Waterfront Theatre at Esplanade opens.
- 28 October – The Digital and Intelligence Service is inaugurated.
- 31 October – The new Hawker Centre at One Punggol is officially opened.

=== November ===
- 1 November – Bukit Canberra Phase 1 is officially opened with an indoor sports hall and a butterfly garden.
- 12 November –
  - Rifle Range Nature Park was launched as an addition to the Central Nature Park Network.
  - Nee Soon Central Community Club, the first CC in a shopping mall in Yishun to be officially opened.
- 13 November – The third stage of the Thomson–East Coast MRT line (spanning from Stevens to Gardens by the Bay) opens.
- 27 November – The Tampines North Bus Interchange opened.

=== December ===
- 6 December – The Singapore Sports Hub has handed over its management to the government sports agency Sports Singapore from its private Sports Hub management to provide an affordable and efficient budgets for more concerts and future National Day Parades (NDPs) to be held there at the National Stadium.
- 9 December – The first fireman who died during an operation was full-time national serviceman Corporal Edward H Go fell unconscious during a firefighting operation at a residential building in Bukit Merah; he was later pronounced dead in Singapore General Hospital. Edward was posthumously promoted to Sergeant(1) and granted a ceremonial funeral.
- 10 December – The Children's Museum (previously occupied by Philatelic Museum) is officially opened to the public.
- 11 December – Senja Hawker Centre and Senja Heights shopping mall are officially opened.
- 13 December – Two more Republic of Singapore Navy Invincible-class submarines are launched in Kiel, and witnessed by Prime Minister of Singapore Lee Hsien Loong and German Chancellor Olaf Scholz.
- 15 December – The new Prime Supermarket in Admiralty Place is opened before the whole of mall was reopened in January the following year.
- 16 December – The Immigration and Checkpoints Authority introduced automated lanes, called Special Assistance Lanes, for multiple travellers to perform self-immigration clearance at selected passenger terminals in Changi Airport.
- 17 December – The new Bukit Canberra Hawker Centre is officially opened.
- 30 December – New Nutri-Grade guidelines to encourage healthier drinks take effect.

== Deaths ==
- 11 January – Isabel Elizabeth Francis, murder victim of the 2022 Ang Mo Kio flat stabbing (b. 1991).
- 21 January – Ethan Yap E Chern and Aston Yap Kai Shern, twins murdered in the Greenridge Crescent twin killings (both b. 2010).
- 8 February – Chau Sik Ting, former MP for Thomson Constituency (b. 1940).
- 13 February – Cynthia Goh, pioneer of palliative care in Singapore (b. 1949).
- 15 February – Richard Tan, pioneer of landscape architecture in Singapore (b. 1934–1935).
- 19 February – Kyi Hla Han, former executive chairman of the Asian Tour (b. 1961).
- 26 February – Santha Bhaskar, dancer, teacher, and choreographer (b. 1939).
- 14 March – Richard Magnus, former senior district judge and Public Transport Council chairman (b. 1944–1945).
- 31 March – Oon Chiew Seng, pioneer of gynaecology in Singapore (b. 1916).
- 12 April – Malathi Das, lawyer and women's rights activist (b. 1969–1970).
- 14 April – Mak Ho Wai, actor (b. 1946).
- 18 April – Bridget Tan, founder of migrant worker rights group Humanitarian Organization for Migration Economics (b. 1948).
- 3 May – Chai Chong Yii, former Senior Minister of State for Education and the first MP for Bukit Batok Constituency (b. 1935).
- 8 May – Sunny Low, ballroom dancer and choreographer (b. 1940).
- 8 June – Oh Ow Kee, busker (b. 1943).
- 8 July – Ong Hock Siang, Barisan Sosialis candidate for Tanjong Pagar SMC during 1963 General Elections (b. 1934).
- 29 July – Lee Seng Tee, Chairman of Lee Foundation, businessman and philanthropist (b. 1923).
- 30 July – Alvin Yeo, lawyer and politician (b. 1962).
- 7 August – Yang Razali Kassim, journalist and former chairman of AMP Singapore (b. 1954/1955).
- 12 August – Lai Kui Fang, artist (b. 1936).
- 25 August – Andrea Teo, film producer (b. 1966).
- 7 September – Guntor Sadali, Berita Harian editor (b. 1952/1953).
- 8 September
  - Richard Eu Keng Mun, former chairman of Eu Yan Sang Holdings (b. 1923).
  - Sujay Solomon Sutherson, Singaporean convicted killer (b. 1981).
- 29 October – Kirpa Ram Vij, former Director, General Staff of the Singapore Armed Forces (b. 1935).
- 9 December – Corporal Edward H Go, first NSF Fireman from SCDF who died while rescuing victims from a burning flat at Henderson Road (b. 2003).
- 17 December – Chan Chee Seng, former senior parliamentary secretary and People's Action Party (PAP) stalwart (b. 1932).
- 20 December – Chia Boon Leong, footballer (b. 1925).
- 26 December – Victoria Lee, an American mixed martial artist who competed in ONE Championship representing both the United States and Singapore (b. 2004).
