= 2023 in Singapore =

- Decades: 2000s; 2010s; 2020s
- See also: Other events of 2023; Timeline of Singaporean history

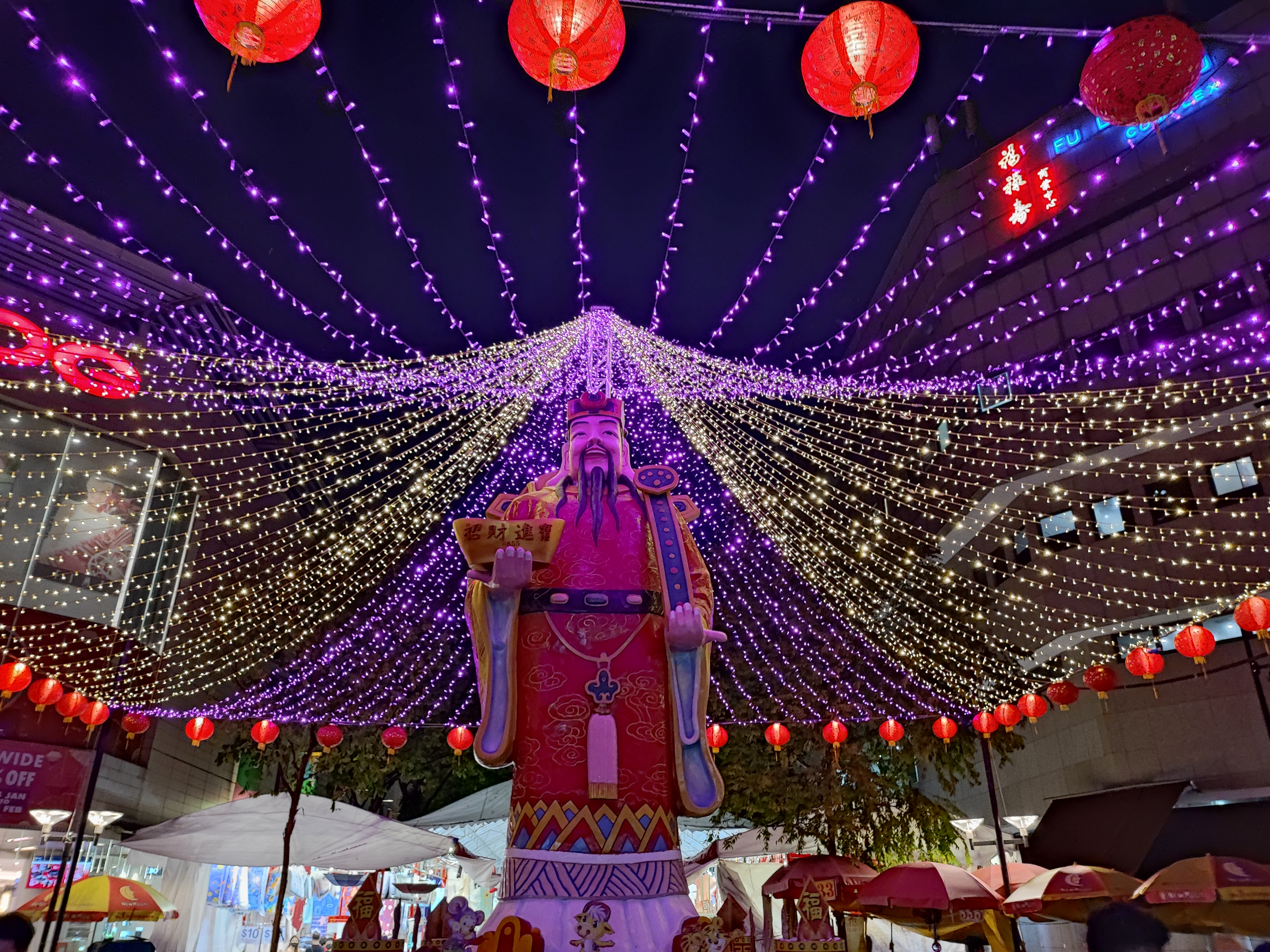
A "God of Wealth" standing outside a wet market in suburban Singapore during the Chinese New Year in 2023

The following lists events that happened during 2023 in the Republic of Singapore.

== Incumbents ==
- President: Halimah Yacob (until 13 September), Tharman Shanmugaratnam (starting 14 September)
- Prime Minister: Lee Hsien Loong

== Events ==
=== January ===
- 1 January – The Goods and Services Tax was raised from 7 to 8 per cent.
- 3 January – Jurong Bird Park is officially closed exactly 52 years after it was first opened.
- 4 January –
  - HomeTeamNS Bedok Reservoir clubhouse is officially opened. The clubhouse features an indoor water theme park.
  - CP: Appointments are no longer needed for individuals to get their COVID-19 vaccinations and boosters at any Joint Testing and Vaccination Centres (JTVC) or Children Vaccination Centre (CVC).
- 9 January – SPH Media Trust's circulation figures were reported to be inflated by about 10 to 12 per cent during a review triggered by the restructuring of the company. It comes a day after an online news media source leaked out.
- 10 January – The revamped Admiralty Place in Woodlands, Singapore officially reopens with Singapore's sixth A&W outlet and a Kopitiam Cantine foodcourt after 4 years of renovation.
- 13 January – Construction starts on the Jurong Region Line.
- 16 January –
  - Mediacorp begins soft-launching its new unified branding across television, radio and digital media products (except CNA and CNA938) while also being teased on their social media accounts, with the inclusion of the "M" prefix to signify their recognition in the digital-first environment. The Mplifier branding takes effect full-time on 1 February.
  - Grab relaunches carpooling service GrabShare for a two-week period from certain locations.
- 18 January – Construction starts on the first phase of the Cross Island Line.
- 19 January – New support centre, SheCares@SCWO, for girls and women who face online harassment opens in Waterloo Street.
- 31 January – SMSes from organisations not in central registry to be labelled as 'likely scam'.

=== February ===
- 7 February – CapitaLand announced plans to redevelop JCube into a 40-storey residential complex with two levels of commercial shops by 2027. As a result, JCube closed down on 6 August.
- 9 February –
  - Singapore is announced as the host of the 2025 World Aquatics Championships after Russia was stripped of the rights to host the event.
  - CP: Plans are announced to move Singapore from DORSCON Level Yellow to Green from 13 February. There will be no mandatory masking on public transport and some healthcare areas, unless if visiting vulnerable patients. There will be no negative tests and insurance required for unvaccinated travellers, with the Popular Places Passes system in four locations for migrant workers scrapped. TraceTogether and SafeEntry are discontinued with all data deleted (with the exception of a murder case in 2020), with the possibility of reactivation if necessary. A token return scheme will be conducted from 13 February to 12 March. People can isolate in dormitories from 1 March. Protocols 1-2-3 are also scrapped, with fees for tests and treatment to start 1 April (no more full subsidies), as well as fees for using Community Treatment Facilities. Vaccinations will continue to be free for citizens, permanent residents, long-term and some short-term pass holders. New vaccination guidelines are also released, with a minimum of three doses (two primary and one booster) and children only requiring two doses. Those vulnerable are encouraged to get boosters. MCs will no longer differentiate between COVID and other respiratory diseases. There will also be an after-action review, with a report on COVID-19 pandemic management to be released and debated in Parliament. Finally, the Multi-Ministry Task Force will stand down, with the Ministry of Health taking charge. Should there be a need, a new multi-agency crisis management structure can be reactivated.
- 13 February – CP: DORSCON Level Yellow reduced to Green.
- 17 February – The revamped Peranakan Museum is officially reopened to the public after nearly four years of renovation works.
- 19 February – The new Tampines Viaduct is officially opened after a delay caused by a collapse in 2017 which killed one worker and injured ten workers.

=== March ===
- 6 March – Sengkang Grand Mall which is located outside Buangkok MRT station is officially opened. Buangkok Integrated Transport Hub will be opened in 2024.
- 8 March – CP: A White Paper on Singapore's Response to COVID-19 is released, setting out seven recommendations to boost preparedness for a future pandemic.
- 21 March – Plans to strengthen Singapore's pandemic readiness were announced by Minister for Health Ong Ye Kung in Parliament, including changing colours in the Disease Outbreak Response System Condition to a four-tiered level, forming the Communicable Diseases Agency to consolidate resources, strengthening healthcare resources and better vaccine procurement.
- 22 March – Jetstar begins operations at Changi Airport T4.
- 26 March – Chong Pang City starts construction and will be completed in 2027.
- 29 March
  - DBS Bank suffers an outage, which affected its digital services for up to 10 hours.
  - Disney announced that it will start cruise services in Singapore from 2025 for a period of five years.
- 31 March – The Immigration and Checkpoints Authority systems suffer an outage affecting clearance at land checkpoints and Changi Airport for four hours.

=== April ===
- 1 April – The new Shaw Plaza and Theatres at Balestier is officially reopened after 4 years of renovation with amenities like shopping malls and a cinema theatre.
- 5 April – Singapore's newest five storey regional library at Punggol is officially opened at One Punggol.
- 30 April – The Perennial Business Park (Formerly Known as Big Box) at Jurong East located at Venture Drive is officially opened.

=== May ===
- 1 May – Strides Taxi and Premier Taxis will merge to form Singapore's second-largest taxi operator.
- 8 May – Bird Paradise (formerly Jurong Bird Park) is the first of the new wildlife parks to open at Mandai Wildlife Reserve.
- 9 May – The Woodleigh Mall at Bidadari (located near Woodleigh MRT Station and Bidadari Community Club) is opened with Singapore's seventh A&W restaurant outlet as well as Fairprice Finest and more.
- 5 to 17 May – Team Singapore Athletes participate in the 32nd South East Asian Games 2023 in Phnom Penh, Cambodia.
- 23 May – Prime Minister Lee Hsien Loong ordered the Corrupt Practices Investigation Bureau (CPIB) to investigate ministers K. Shanmugam and Vivian Balakrishnan over their rentals of state-owned bungalows at 26 and 31 Ridout Road respectively.
- 29 May – Halimah Yacob announces her decision not to seek a second presidential term.

=== June ===
- 1 June –
  - Stricter measures against table littering and not clearing crockeries in foodcourts, coffeeshops and hawker centres kicks in with offenders facing immediate written warnings and fines under Singapore's Environmental Public Health Act.
  - Amendments to the Misuse Of Drugs Act kick in, with increased punishments and caning for possession of selected controlled drugs above certain weight thresholds.
  - SAFRA opened its seventh clubhouse, also known as its 'fitness oasis' at Choa Chu Kang.
- 2 June – The Aqua Adventure Waterpark at HomeTeamNS Bedok Reservoir is officially opened.
- 4 June – The first new set of Alstom Movia R151 train debuts on the East West Line.
- 8 June – Senior Minister Tharman Shanmugaratnam announces his resignation from the People's Action Party and his respective offices in order to announce his candidacy for the Presidential Elections. The resignations take effect on 7 July.
- 12 June – Harvey Norman Ossia founder George Goh Ching Wah announces his candidacy for the Presidential Elections.
- 15 June – Parts of Fuji Xerox Towers collapses during demolition works, killing a worker trapped inside.
- 24 June – The 15th edition of Pink Dot SG is held at Hong Lim Park. It is the first edition since the repeal of Section 377A.
- 25 June - The PAssion Wave @ Bedok Reservoir is officially opened for kayaking or dragon boating activities to be held there as organised by the People's Association. It is the third community club in Singapore to be opened aside from Marina Bay in 2015, Jurong Lake Gardens in 2019.
- 30 June –
  - Cathay Cineplexes closes its Cineleisure branch after operating for almost 26 years.
  - library@esplanade closes its doors after operating for almost 21 years.

=== July ===
- 1 July – The revamped Admiralty Place was officially opened to shoppers that includes Prime Supermarket (which opened on 15 December 2022, as well as A&W restaurant which opened in February this year, and many more new shops).
- 3 July –
  - Plastic bag charge at most Singapore supermarkets start.
  - Senior Minister Teo Chee Hean cleared Ministers K. Shanmugam and Vivian Balakrishnan of any criminal and ethical wrongdoing after an almost six-hour debate on the Ridout Road rentals reports.
- 6 July – SMRT launches iSafe, am AI video analytics system to boost safety on the Bukit Panjang LRT line.
- 12 July – Transport Minister S. Iswaran is announced to be assisting investigations into a corruption probe by the Corrupt Practices Investigation Bureau (CPIB). Senior Minister of State Chee Hong Tat becomes Acting Minister of Transport as a result.
- 14 July – Singapore-based Malaysian businessman Ong Beng Seng's arrest by the CPIB is reported in connection with a corruption probe involving Minister S. Iswaran. CPIB revealed later that both were arrested on 11 July.
- 17 July – Speaker of Parliament and Member of Parliament for Marine Parade GRC, Tan Chuan-Jin, and Member of Parliament for Tampines GRC, Cheng Li Hui, resign from the People's Action Party and their respective offices after revelations of an extramarital affair between them.
- 19 July –
  - Leader of the Opposition Pritam Singh announces the resignation of Leon Perera as a Member of Parliament for Aljunied GRC and from the Workers' Party over an extramarital affair with fellow WP politician Nicole Seah; the latter resigning as well.
  - Former GIC chief investment officer Ng Kok Song announces his candidacy for the Presidential Elections.
- 20 July – Ride-hailing firm Grab announces its proposed acquisition of Trans-Cab, Singapore's third-largest taxi company. It will be done via a company arm called GrabRentals.
- 21 July – Uvaraja Gopal, a police sergeant of Indian origin, commits suicide, garnering widespread media attention.
- 26 July to 2 August – The inaugural Festival of Football saw five European football clubs play over three matches as part of their pre-season tours.
- 28 July – Plans for Brickland MRT station are unveiled. The station will start construction in 2024, with completion by 2034.
- 30 July – Former 2011 presidential election candidate Tan Kin Lian announces he has submitted his forms, with a future decision to be made on contesting the elections.

=== August ===
- 2 August – Seah Kian Peng is elected Speaker of the Parliament of Singapore.
- 11 August – Prime Minister Lee Hsien Loong issues the Writ of Election for the presidential elections. After the dates are announced, Teacher's Day and several exams for N Levels will be moved to 11 September, as well as 12 and 20 September respectively.
- 15 August – In what was the largest money laundering case in Singapore, 10 foreign nationals were arrested and over S$1 billion worth of cash and assets seized, frozen or issued prohibition of disposal orders. The value of assets involved would later balloon to S$3 billion, making it one of the world's largest money laundering cases.
- 16 August – The 10 foreign nationals arrested for their involvement in the largest money laundering case in Singapore are charged in court.
- 17 August – At the close of forms, six candidates have filed Certificates of Eligibility, with 16 applications for Community Declarations.
- 18 August – Tharman Shanmugaratnam, Ng Kok Song, and Tan Kin Lian are awarded Certificates of Eligibility, with George Goh Ching Wah among three who did not succeed in a Certificate of Eligibility. The reason is later revealed that the five companies listed did not meet the S$500 million shareholders equity requirement. Only six of the 16 Community Declarations are accepted.
- 20 August – Prime Minister Lee Hsien Loong delivered his National Day Rally 2023 speech.
- 22 August – Tharman Shanmugaratnam, Ng Kok Song, and Tan Kin Lian confirmed their nominations for the presidential elections.
- 29 August – Holland Village Market and Food Centre is reopened after one year of renovation since mid-2022, with several unique local stalls such as Holland Village Fried Bee Hoon, 363 Katong Laksa, and Mala Xiang Guo.

=== September ===
- 1 September – 2023 Singaporean presidential election: Singaporeans vote for their 9th president. Former senior minister Tharman Shanmugaratnam is elected with 1,746,427 votes (70.40%). Ng Kok Song came second with 390,041 votes (15.72%), with Tan Kin Lian getting 344,292 votes (13.88%). Ng had earlier conceded after the sample counts showed a 70% score for Tharman, with Tan stopping short of it earlier. Both offered their congratulations. For Tan, the results were an improvement after he had his election deposit forfeited in 2011.
- 14 September – Tharman Shanmugaratnam is sworn in as Singapore's 9th President.
- 28 September – Changi Airport Terminal 2 northern wing resumes flight operations.

=== October ===
- 5 October – The Jurong West Hawker Centre is officially reopened as JW50 food centre after three years of closure since its original openings back in 2017.
- 10 October – Construction starts on the Punggol extension of the Cross Island MRT line, with completion by 2032.
- 15 October – Bukit Canberra Swimming Complex and the public access ActiveSG Gym in Sembawang are officially opened.
- 25 October – Four cars belonging to one of the ten accused in one of the world's largest money laundering case are impounded and towed out. At the same time, Singaporean police officers confiscated Bearbricks linked to one of the accused in the same case.
- 27 October – The Forward Singapore Report is released, detailing seven major shifts in Singapore's social compact and several new policy changes, including ComLink+ and Singapore Government Partnerships Office.
- 28 October – Trifecta Sports Complex, a sports centre in Somerset is opened.

=== November ===
- 1 November –
  - Banks will start charging all customers who issue Singdollar cheques.
  - Changi Airport Terminal 2 fully reopens after 3 1/2 years of upgrading.
  - ERP 2.0 units installation will begin starting with company vehicles.
- 5 November – Prime Minister Lee Hsien Loong announced at the People's Action Party convention that he will hand over the position to Deputy Prime Minister Lawrence Wong before the PAP's 70th year and the next General Election. This comes after DPM Wong's declaration that he was ready for the next step.
- 7 November – The Earthshot Prize ceremony takes place in Singapore and was attended by Prince William.
- 21 November – Hyundai Motor Group Innovation Centre is officially opened, allowing cars to be assembled here. The plant also has an area to grow vegetables, and robotaxis being tested.
- 23 November – SAFRA has officially opened its seventh clubhouse at Choa Chu Kang by Deputy Prime Minister (DPM) Lawrence Wong.
- 25 November – Sembawang Polyclinic, located within Bukit Canberra, opened.
- 26 November – Jurong Town Hall Bus Interchange is opened with one bus service that leads to the residential areas of Tengah.
- 30 November – Buangkok Hawker Centre, which is located at the premises of Sengkang Grand Mall is officially opened.

=== December ===
- 1 December –
  - The Bus Collective, a resort hotel in Changi Village featuring 20 retired public buses transformed into accommodations, opens to the public.
  - One Holland Village Mall, a pet-friendly mall in Holland Village, Singapore is officially opened to shoppers.

== Deaths ==
- 3 January – Eric Low, former PAP politician (b. 1948).
- 4 January – Sim Wong Hoo, founder of Creative Technology (b. 1955).
- 7 January – William S. W. Lim, architect (Marine Parade Community Building, People's Park Complex, Golden Mile Complex) (b. 1932).
- 9 January – Timothy Nga, Singaporean actor and celebrity (b. 1973).
- 5 February – Ong Leong Boon, former PAP Member of Parliament for Kim Seng Constituency (b. 1944).
- 17 March – Alex Abisheganaden, Singaporean guitarist and recipient of the Cultural Medallion (b. 1926).
- 25 March – Chan Sun Wing, former Parliamentary Secretary to the Prime Minister's Office and former legislative assemblyman for Upper Serangoon Constituency and Nee Soon Constituency (b. 1933).
- 22 May – Wahid Satay, actor (b. 1930).
- 28 May – Tan Eng Liang, ex-national water polo player, veteran sports administrator and former PAP Member of Parliament for River Valley Constituency (b. 1937).
- 7 June – Lim Kean Chye, one of the founders of the Malayan Democratic Union (b. 1919).
- 7 July – Tan Yock Lin, NUS senior law professor (b. 1953).
- 8 July
  - Lim Chong Yah, economist, economics professor, founding leader of National Wages Council and father-in-law of Lee Hsien Yang (b. 1932).
  - Adrian Tan, Singaporean lawyer and President of the Law Society of Singapore (b. 1966).
- 9 July – Alice Ho, actress and qigong advocate (b. 1951).
- 21 July – Uvaraja Gopal, police officer who took his own life (b. 1987/1988).
- 28 July – Saridewi Djamani, convicted drug trafficker who was executed in Singapore for trafficking 30.72 grams of heroin in 2018. She was also the first female death row convict to be executed in Singapore in nearly twenty years.
- 29 July – Manimaran Ashukumar, Assistant Treasurer of the Singapore Democratic Party (b. 1990).
- 8 September – Richard Hu, 6th Minister of Finance (b. 1926).
- 10 November – Yaw Shin Leong, former Workers' Party Member of Parliament for Hougang SMC (b. 1976).
- 15 November – Tang Hu, veteran actor (b. 1940).
- 18 December – Lee Tee Tong, former Barisan Sosialis legislative assemblyman for Bukit Timah Constituency (b. 1931).
