= 2025 in Singapore =

- Decades: 2000s; 2010s; 2020s
- See also: Other events of 2025; Timeline of Singaporean history

The following lists events that happened during 2025 in the Republic of Singapore.

== Incumbents ==
- President: Tharman Shanmugaratnam
- Prime Minister: Lawrence Wong

== Events ==
=== January ===
- 1 January
  - Through the New Year's festivities held under the "ONE Countdown 2025" initiative, the country officially inaugurates SG60, a year-long celebration marking the 60th anniversary of the independence of Singapore.
  - The Platform Workers Act, providing labour protection and a distinct legal category for gig workers, comes into force.
- 3 January – The Energy Market Authority awards PacificLight Power a contract to build a gas and hydrogen power plant on Jurong Island, with completion by 2029. The plant will initially start with 30% hydrogen capacity.
- 5 January – Construction begins on the Toa Payoh Integrated Development, with plans for sports facilities now unveiled. The development will feature a 10,000-seat stadium for events, and is set for completion by 2030.
- 6 January
  - The Land Transport Authority announces that three new MRT stations, connecting the Downtown Line and North-South Line, will open by 2035. It will consist of an interchange station at Sungei Kadut (called Sungei Kadut MRT Station), and a new station on the Downtown Line.
  - Law and Home Affairs Minister K. Shanmugam and Manpower Minister Tan See Leng file defamation suits against Bloomberg and one of its journalists.
- 7 January
  - The parliament passes a law removing mandatory minimum sentences and the disqualification period for first-time dangerous and careless driving offenders.
  - The parliament passes a Bill setting out the legislative framework for the establishment of the Communicable Diseases Agency (CDA), a new statutory board.
  - The parliament passes a law providing the police with powers to order banks to restrict the banking transactions of potential scam victims.
  - At the 11th Malaysia-Singapore Leaders' Retreat, the two governments exchange an MoU on the Johor-Singapore Special Economic Zone. The special economic zone aims to create 20,000 skilled jobs in the first five years.
- 8 January
  - The parliament passes the Workplace Fairness Act, a piece of legislation aimed at protecting workers against discrimination. The act is set to be implemented by 2027.
  - The Straits Times Index closes with a new record high of 3,886.98, driven by gains in bank stocks and a shipping company. This surpasses the previous record of 3,875.77 set on 11 October 2007, marking a 17-year high.
- 9 January – The Internal Security Department confirmed it had detained three men under the Internal Security Act in October 2024 for making plans to acquire weapons and travel overseas to fight against Israel.
- 11 January
  - The Immigration and Checkpoints Authority says it has suspended a service that allows Singapore residents to update residential addresses online, after about 80 cases of unauthorised attempts to change registered residential addresses via a third party.
  - The Maritime Rescue Coordination Centre, operated by Maritime and Port Authority of Singapore (MPA), coordinates a successful rescue of 18 crew members of a Vietnam-registered freighter that sank off the coast southwest of Vung Tau, Vietnam.
- 12 January – A Malaysia-registered tanker sinks in Singapore's territorial waters off Pedra Branca. All eight crew members evacuate safely. The Maritime and Port Authority of Singapore (MPA) says that salvage tugs are activated to recover the vessel. Oil spill response craft are also activated as a precaution.
- 14 January – Mandai Wildlife Reserve opens Mandai Broadwalk, a free 3.3 km (2.1 miles) route skirting River Wonders and Singapore Zoo.
- 15 January – The foreign ministers of Singapore and Saudi Arabia sign an MoU to establish the Saudi-Singapore Strategic Partnership Council, with the aim to strengthen cooperation in economic, defence and people-to-people ties.
- 19 January – The Special Accounts of about 1.4 million Central Provident Fund (CPF) members aged 55 and above are closed. The planned closure was first announced in Budget 2024.
- 22 January – The Electoral Boundaries Review Committee is convened to review the electoral map for the upcoming general election.

=== February ===
- 3 February – The Housing and Development Board announces that, after a successful pilot in Tampines, heat-reflective paint will be applied to all HDB estates by 2030.
- 4 February
  - The parliament passes the Maintenance of Racial Harmony Bill.
  - Minister for Sustainability and the Environment Grace Fu announces that Singapore will spend about S$150 million on drainage upgrading projects in the 2025 financial year to strengthen the country's flood resilience.
  - The National Parks Board announces that it is funding a research into ticks and tick-borne diseases with S$2.4 million as a part of the wider effort of zoonotic diseases monitoring.
- 10 February
  - The Internal Security Department (ISD) confirms it had issued an Internal Security Act (ISA) restriction order against housewife Hamizah Hamzah for running social media accounts promoting pro-Axis of Resistance and Hamas content. Her husband and cleaner Saharuddin Saari was deported to Malaysia in November 2024.
  - The ISD confirms it had detained 18-year-old student Nick Lee Xing Qiu, who had expoused far right and neo-Nazi beliefs and views, under the ISA in December 2024 for planning to attack Muslims.
  - The Ministry of Home Affairs confirms it had deported Iranian national Parvane Heidaridehkordi and her Malaysian husband Soo Thean Ling for running a travel company that sponsored visa applications by terrorism-linked foreigners seeking to enter Singapore.
- 14 February – Minion Land is officially opened in Universal Studios Singapore.
- 17 February – Leader of the Opposition Pritam Singh is convicted of lying under oath to a parliamentary committee in a perjury case involving former opposition MP Raeesah Khan and is issued with a total of S$14,000 in fines.
- 18 February – The Budget 2025 is delivered by Prime Minister Lawrence Wong.
- 19 February – The execution of Malaysian death row inmate Pannir Selvam Pranthaman, who was convicted for drug trafficking, is postponed a day before it is scheduled to be held after the Court of Appeal of Singapore grants a stay, citing an ongoing constitutional challenge by other death row prisoners to a section under Singapore's drug law. Pannir was subsequently executed on 8 October 2025 after his constitutional challenge was dismissed.
- 25 February – HomeTeamNS servers containing employee data past and present are hit by a ransomware attack.
- 28 February
  - Hume MRT station is officially opened for service.
  - A crew member on the Singapore-registered chemical tanker Basset is injured after an unauthorised boarding in the Singapore Strait.
  - A total of 187 cases of gastroenteritis are reported from the consumption of ready-to-eat (RTE) meals which were distributed as part of a Total Defence Day exercise.

=== March ===
• 1 March - Punggol Coast Mall, the one and only shopping mall in Punggol Digital District that is connected to Punggol Coast MRT station is officially opened to the public.

- 5 March
  - In a parliamentary debate, Minister for Transport Chee Hong Tat announces the go-ahead for the West Coast Extension of the Jurong Region MRT line in two phases, with the first phase by the late-2030s, and the second by the early-2040s. Two new MRT lines will be studied, being the Seletar Line and Tengah Line, with possibly being merged as a long MRT line.
  - The Ministry of Transport announces that taxi companies will be allowed to sell taxis and convert used vehicles under five years old into taxi, subject to approval from the Land Transport Authority.
- 11 March – General Elections: The Electoral Boundaries Review Committee report is released. The 15th parliament will consist of 97 members from 33 constituencies (15 Single Member Constituencies and 18 Group Representation Constituencies), up from 93 seats from the current 31 constituencies. An opposition-held ward, Aljunied GRC, will see changes to their boundaries.
- 12 March – Singapore's fifth wildlife park Rainforest Wild Adventure West opens at Mandai Wildlife Reserve.
- 24 March – DFI Retail Group announce that they will sell their stakes in Cold Storage and Giant to Macrovalue for S$125 million, with the transaction to be completed by year-end.

=== April ===
- 1 April
  - The first phase of shared parental leave scheme of six weeks takes effect for parents of children born on or after 1 April. The additional two weeks of voluntary paternity leave is also made compulsory, making the total four weeks.
  - The Communicable Diseases Agency is formed.
- 2 April – The Internal Security Department announces the detention of a 17-year-old boy on suspicion of plotting to attack and kill Muslims in five mosques across the country.
- 8 April – In response to Liberation Day tariffs by the United States, Prime Minister Lawrence Wong announced the setting up of a taskforce chaired by Deputy Prime Minister Gan Kim Yong to steer the Singapore economy. The first meeting under the Singapore Economic Resilience Taskforce happened on 16 April.
- 15 April – General Elections: The 14th Parliament is dissolved.
- 18 April – Minister of Defence Ng Eng Hen announced his retirement from politics.
- 20 April – Woodleigh Bus Interchange opens.
- 21 April – Senior Minister Teo Chee Hean announced his retirement from politics.
- 23 April
  - Nomination day for the General Elections: The People's Action Party returns unopposed in Marine Parade-Braddell Heights GRC after a walkover, resulting in a win of 5 seats.
  - Deputy Prime Minister Heng Swee Keat announces he will not contest in GE2025.

=== May ===
- 3 May – General Elections:
  - The ruling People's Action Party (PAP), led by Lawrence Wong for the first time, retains its majority in the elections with 87 out of 97 seats, with an overall vote share of 65.57%.
  - Main opposition Workers' Party (WP) retains 10 seats from its current constituencies (Aljunied GRC, Hougang SMC and Sengkang GRC).
- 11 May – Former hockey Olympian Arjun Menon was abducted & murdered by abductors in Blantyre, Malawi.
- 14 May – Changi Airport Terminal 5 starts construction.
- 19 May – Workers' Party's Andre Low and Eileen Chong become Non-constituency Members of Parliament in the 15th Parliament of Singapore.
- 20 May – The Maritime Rescue Coordination Centre coordinates a successful rescue of 30 crew members of an Indonesia-registered vessel that sank off Pedra Branca.
- 21 May – Prime Minister Lawrence Wong unveils his new Cabinet, with three new Coordinating Ministers, two Acting Ministers along with several new appointees.
- 28 May – 106 people are arrested in Singapore after a month-long transnational anti-scam operation.
- 30 May – Two new town councils are established in Jalan Kayu and Punggol, bringing the number of town councils to 19. Of the existing 17, 12 will see area changes, with the rest unchanged.

=== June ===
- 1 June – Non-life-threatening 995 calls are referred to a medical triage helpline in a nationwide trial.
- 3 June – Public transport operator SMRT is fined S$3 million for lapses leading to 2024 East–West MRT line disruption. Several measures to maintain the resilience of the rail network are announced too, including the formation of a Tripartite group.
- 4 June – The caterer Yunhaiyao is charged with two offences in the aftermath of the 2024 mass food poisoning incident at the Singapore office of ByteDance.
- 10 June – The Singapore Government and Regent of Johor agree to a land swap such that the Regent can develop properties further away from Singapore Botanic Gardens. This will involve 13ha of land close to the Gardens by the Regent given to Singapore, and in turn 8.5ha of state land will be given back.
- 15 June – A man is shot and injured while cycling in restricted area near the Singapore Armed Forces' live-firing range in Nee Soon. As a result, all live firing area signs are gradually replaced by newer Armed Guard Protected Area signs, with the opening of the realigned Lim Chu Kang Road, with the old live firing area signs being relegated to Pasir Ris and Tengah areas because of decommissioning.
- 16 June - Singaporean Permanent Resident & Channel 8 actor Ian Fang sentenced to 40 months jail for sexual assault.
- 18 June – The Ministry of Health launches national mindline 1771 as a one-stop helpline for anyone needing mental health assistance, being staffed with full-time staff and counselors. The existing helpline by the Institute of Mental Health was decommissioned the same day, and another programme to train volunteers is in the works.
- 20 June – Minister in the Prime Minister's Office Indranee Rajah is designated by Prime Minister Lawrence Wong as Leader of the House.
- 23 June – The fully automated Syed Alwi Pumping Station opens in Jalan Besar, providing the low-lying area better protection against flood.
- 24 June – Tsutomu Ogura resigns as head coach of the Singapore national football team due to personal reasons.
- 25 June – Minister for National Development Chee Hong Tat unveils the Draft Master Plan 2025. Some plans include the Bishan Subregional Centre, more conserved buildings and Identity Nodes, three more parks, more mixed community facilities in Sengkang, Yishun and Woodlands, more developments in places like Newton and Orchard, and an underground cavern for construction materials.
- 26 June – The National Semiconductor Translation and Innovation Centre for Gallium Nitride, or NSTIC (GaN), launches. It will be the first facility in Singapore to have both 6-inch gallium nitride on silicon carbide and 8-inch gallium nitride on silicon wafer fabrication lines.
- 29 June – The Punggol Coast Bus Interchange opens.
- 30 June
  - Yale-NUS College closes and merges with University Scholars Programme to form NUS College.
  - The first train for the Johor Bahru-Singapore Rapid Transit System is launched at the Singapore Rail Test Centre.

=== July ===
- 1 July
  - The existing hard cap on how long a non-domestic-helper migrant worker can work in Singapore is removed.
  - New rules to separate cyclists and pedestrians on shared paths take effect.
  - The Protection from Scams Act which allows the police to freeze bank accounts to prevent users from being scammed take effect.
  - Resorts World Sentosa officially opens Weave, a sustainability-inspired mall with innovative retail concepts.
- 2 July
  - Caterer Yunhaiyao pleads guilty to two charges related to the 2024 mass food poisoning incident at the Singapore office of ByteDance.
  - Grab launches its new taxi company, GrabCab, with an initial fleet of 40 electric vehicles.
- 3 July – The Ministry of National Development (MND) announces that, in effect for purchase on and after July 4, private property owners who sell their homes within four years of the purchase will incur a seller's stamp duty and pay a higher rate. The holding period was previously three years.
- 4 July – The Monetary Authority of Singapore (MAS) imposes S$27.45 million in penalties on nine financial institutions for breaches related to the 2023 money laundering case.
- 7 July – The Land Transport Authority (LTA) commences construction for Phase 2 of the Cross Island Line (CRL). Of the six new underground stations, Clementi and King Albert Park will be interchange station connecting to the East-West Line and Downtown Line respectively.
- 11 July
  - 2025 World Aquatics Championships opens.
  - Singapore Nuclear Research and Safety Institute (SNRSI) opens in National University of Singapore.
- 16 July – Las Vegas Sands breaks ground on an expansion of Marina Bay Sands which will add a fourth hotel tower, an arena and additional convention space.
- 18 July – The government announces that the country's critical information infrastructure had been subjected to a cyberattack by the state-sponsored cyber espionage group, UNC3886.
- 20 July – Minister for Health Ong Ye Kung announced more channels to report vapes, and that etomidate will be re-classified as a Class C drug under the Misuse of Drugs Act to stem such cases.
- 21 July – The Ministry of Health announces that approximately 20,000 individuals received incorrect amount of subsidy due to "processing issue" in its Household Means Eligibility System.
- 22 July – The Online Citizen is declared as a Declared Online Locations under POFMA and barred from receiving financial benefits for the next two years.
- 23 July – Singapore Oceanarium officially opens as the replacement to SEA Aquarium. The attraction is three times larger with 22 zones. It also has a Research and Learning Centre and collaborations with universities to enhance marine conservation.
- 24 July – The SPF and CSA announces that there was an online leak of traffic police records after a ransomware attack on one of its print vendors. The leak includes names, addresses, NRIC numbers and details of traffic violations of 1,300 individuals.
- 25 July
  - The Land Transport Authority reduces the financial penalty it imposed on SMRT for the 2024 East–West MRT line disruption from S$3 million to S$2.4 million.
  - The Land Transport Authority reveals that Changi Airport Terminal 5 will be an interchange between the Thomson-East Coast Line and the Cross Island Line, with conversion of the existing Changi Airport Line of the East West Line to follow. The project is estimated to finish by the mid-2030s.
  - Red "vape bins" are set up to encourage the non-punitive disposal of e-cigarettes.
- 26 July – A sinkhole forms on Tanjong Katong Road, swallowing a passing vehicle. The driver is rescued by nearby construction workers. On 27 July, PUB discloses that the formation is linked to the failure of a nearby concrete sewage shaft and calls for safety time-out to review similar construction works across Singapore.
- 31 July – Jetstar Asia, a budget airline based in Singapore and owned by Qantas, ceases operation.

=== August ===
- 4 August
  - Malaysian businessman Ong Beng Seng pleads guilty to charges of obstruction of justice in the S. Iswaran graft case.
  - Deputy Prime Minister Gan Kim Yong announces an Economic Strategy Review, with five committees formed and findings expected to be published by mid-2026.
- 5 August – The Civil Aviation Authority of Singapore updates its regulation to allow higher buildings to be built around airports.
- 6 August – A track point fault on the East West Line causes a train delay lasting five hours.
- 11 August – Keppel announces that they will sell M1's consumer business to Simba Telecom for S$1.43 billion. Keppel shall retain the information and communications businesses.
- 12 August
  - A power fault disrupts train services on North East MRT line, Sengkang LRT line and Punggol LRT line for three hours.
  - Starhub announces it has fully acquired the broadband business of MyRepublic for S$105.2 million.
- 15 August
  - Mandai North Crematorium opens, housing six service halls and eighteen cremators.
  - Ong Beng Seng is sentenced to a maximum fine of S$30,000 after the court grants judicial mercy due to ill-health.
- 17 August – Prime Minister Lawrence Wong delivers his 2025 National Day Rally speech.
- 18 August – In a trial, licensed bars, pubs and clubs in Boat Quay, Clarke Quay, Upper Circular Road can apply to extend their alcohol trading hours to 4am on Fridays and Saturdays.
- 19 August
  - After 11 years in business, local independent movie theatre, The Projector, announces that it has ceased operations and entered voluntary liquidation.
  - As part of a new programme, recruits at the Basic Military Training Centre (BMTC) on Pulau Tekong will get about six hours of drone training using the DJI Neo.
- 20 August – Second Minister for Home Affairs Edwin Tong announced the implementation of a Cell Broadcast System, enabling delivery of emergency alerts to the public via mobile phones.
- 31 August – Urgent Care Centre in Admiralty ceases operations permanently due to low patient-to-staff ratio.

=== September ===
- 1 September
  - Kallang Basin Swimming Complex ceases operations permanently, with the existing site being studied for public housing.
  - Etomidate, an anaesthetic agent often found in drug-laced vape known as Kpod, is re-classified as an illegal drug under the Misuse of Drugs Act with offenders facing much harsher punishments such as mandatory jail terms and mandatory caning.
  - mm2 announces that Cathay Cineplexes has entered voluntary liquidation.
- 4 September – Singapore becomes the first country to declare turbulence a major in-flight threat after severe turbulence on Singapore Airlines Flight 321 killed one person and injured 104 others in 2024.
- 5 September – The 15th Parliament of Singapore opens. Speaker Of Parliament Seah Kian Peng and Leader Of The House Indranee Rajah were elected for the roles once again.
- 9 September
  - Plans are announced for a new TTSH Medical Tower and other enhancements to the HealthCity Novena area as part of a plan to further cater for future healthcare demand in Central Singapore.
  - The Internal Security Department arrests a 14-year-old with a mix of extremist ideologies.
- 10 September – Defence Minister Chan Chun Sing informs US Secretary of Defense Pete Hegseth of Singapore's decision to acquire four Boeing P-8As to replace the Fokker-50 Maritime Patrol Aircraft during his introductory visit to the United States.
- 19 September – Indian singer Zubeen Garg dies in a drowning incident off the coast of Saint John's Island.
- 26 September – The last four Kawasaki Heavy Industries C151 trains make their final journey on the North South Line and East West Line, with a commemorative ride done two days later.
- 27 September – Hong Kong pro-democracy activist Nathan Law is detained by border authorities and sent back to the United States while trying to attend a conference in Singapore. The government subsequently says his entry "would not be in its national interests".

=== October ===
- 1 October – St Wilfred Sport Centre ceases operations, with the existing site being studied for public housing.
- 3–5 October – Singapore Grand Prix (Formula One) is held. For the first time in the history of Formula One, a Heat Hazard warning is declared for the race on 2 October after Meteorological Service Singapore forecasts temperatures of at least 31 °C (88 °F).
- 22 October – Community organisers Mossammad Sobikun Nahar and Kokila Annamalai, along with content creator Siti Amirah Mohamed Asrori, are acquitted on charges of organising a procession without a permit in a prohibited area after they held a pro-Palestine march in the vicinity of The Istana in February 2024.
- 28 October – Mapletree announced they will close HarbourFront Centre by the second half of 2026. In its place will be a redeveloped complex featuring a 33-storey building and commercial spaces, with a publicly accessible park. The ferry terminal will be outside the complex. The redevelopment will be completed by the first half of 2031.
- 30 October – Power 98 and 883Jia discontinued their FM broadcast, with broadcasts moved to their digital app Kakee.

=== November ===
- 3 November – The Government announces its intention to gazette 38 Oxley Road due to its historic value.
- 13 November – An Australian national Johnson Wen, was arrested and subsequently charged for grabbing actress Ariana Grande during a premiere event for the film Wicked: For Good at Resorts World Sentosa. He is subsequently sentenced to nine days' imprisonment on 17 November after being convicted on public nuisance charges and then deported to Australia and banned from re-entering Singapore for life afterwards.
- 18 November – Singapore qualifies on merit for the 2027 AFC Asian Cup after defeating Hong Kong 2–1 at Kai Tak Stadium. It is the first time that Singapore qualifies on merit for a major football tournament.
- 21 November — Singapore imposes financial sanctions and travel bans on four Israeli citizens who had been implicated in violence and incitement against Palestinians in the West Bank.

=== December ===
- 1 December – Revisions to Permanent Resident Re-Entry Permit (REP) Application Process will take effect such that Singapore Permanent Residents residing outside of Singapore without a valid REP will have 180 days to apply for an REP before they lose their Singapore PR status. Prior to 1 December 2025, Singapore Permanent Residents residing outside of Singapore without a valid REP are deemed by the Immigration & Checkpoints Authority (ICA) to have automatically lost their Singapore PR status.
- 4 December – Pritam Singh's court appeal for his case was dismissed.
- 9–20 December – Singapore at the 2025 SEA Games
- 30 December – Amendments to Singapore's criminal law mandating caning for scammers and discretionary caning for scam mules took effect.
- 31 December – Mountbatten Vocational School, which trains students with special needs aged 14 to 21 closed.

== Deaths ==
- 6 January – Fock Siew Wah, founding chairman of the Land Transport Authority and SMRT Corporation (b. 1940).
- 18 January – Thien Chor Meng, founder of Da Po Hainanese Chicken Rice and Curry Chicken Noodle (b. 1947/1948).
- 20 January – Lynn Ban, Singaporean-born American jewelry designer and actress known for appearing in Netflix's Bling Empire: New York (b. 1973).
- 23 January – Jonathan Lim, playwright known for Chestnuts show (b. 1964).
- 25 January – Syed Suhail Syed Zin, convicted drug trafficker who was executed in Singapore for trafficking 38.84 grammes of diamorphine in late 2015 (b. 1976).
- 30 January – Ng Hark Seng, former chairman of E-Bridge Pre-school and figure in Singapore's early childhood education industry (b. 1948).
- 1 February – Chan Kong Thoe, Singapore's first kidney transplant surgeon (b. 1930).
- 3 February – Lim Tze Peng, artist and Cultural Medallion recipient (b. 1921).
- 5 February – Iskandar bin Rahmat, former police officer executed for Kovan double murders (b. 1979).
- 12 February – Moses Lim, actor, comedian and food critic (b. 1949).
- 19 February – Glenn Knight, lawyer (b. 1944).
- 23 February – Teo Chiang Long, former President of Ngee Ann Kongsi and Teochew Poit Ip Huay Kuan (b. 1943).
- 12 March – Renuka Sathianathan, former runner and representative for 2011 SEA Games & 2015 SEA Games (b. 1987).
- 6 April – Lee Ek Tieng, former bureaucrat & permanent secretary of the Ministry of the Environment (b. 1933).
- 16 April
  - Yusnor Ef, musician (b. 1937).
  - Teo Ghim Heng, executed for the Woodlands double murders (b. 1975/1976).
- 22 April – Puan Noor Aishah, former First Lady of Singapore and spouse of 1st President Yusof Ishak (b. 1933).
- 11 May – Arjun Menon, former hockey champion killed by abductors in Blantyre, Malawi (b. 1977).
- 22 May – Chok Koh Tong, former CEC member of Barisan Sosialis and one-time Organising Secretary of the PAP Tanjong Pagar Branch (b. 1935).
- 23 May – Muhammad Salleh bin Hamid, convicted drug trafficker who was executed in Singapore for trafficking methamphetamine (b. 1987/1988).
- 5 June – Lee Wai Leng, former Workers' Party candidate for Ang Mo Kio GRC in the 2006 General Election and founding CEC member of People's Power Party (b. 1978).
- 27 June – Chua Lam, columnist and food critic (b. 1941).
- 30 June – Thio Su Mien, lawyer and first female dean of NUS Faculty of Law (b. 1938).
- 7 July – Sheikh Syed Isa Semait, 2nd Mufti of Singapore (b. 1938).
- 22 July – Lim See Young, Chinese calligrapher and artist (b. 1940).
- 11 August – Choo Hoey, founding music director of Singapore Symphony Orchestra and Cultural Medallion recipient (b. 1934).
- 12 August – Goh Cheng Liang, Singaporean billionaire (b. 1927).
- 15 September – Tang Liang Hong, former Workers' Party politician and 1997 General Election candidate for Cheng San GRC (b. 1935).
- 25 September – Datchinamurthy Kataiah, Malaysian convicted drug trafficker who was executed in Singapore for drug trafficking (b. 1985).
- 8 October – Pannir Selvam Pranthaman, Malaysian convicted drug trafficker who was executed in Singapore for drug trafficking (b. 1987).
- 15 October – Hamzah Bin Ibrahim and Tika Pesik, convicted drug traffickers who were executed in Singapore for drug trafficking
- 4 November – Cheng Tong Fatt, 1st Ambassador of Singapore to China (b. 1929).
- 26 November – Tan Kay Yong, convicted drug trafficker who was executed in Singapore for trafficking 18.71g of diamorphine.
- 27 November – Mohammad Rizwan and Saminathan Selvaraju, convicted drug traffickers who were executed in Singapore for drug trafficking.
- 13 December – Ling Xiao, veteran singer and actor (b. 1950).
- 24 December – M Ravi, international human rights lawyer and activist (b. 1969).
