= Autonomous shuttles in Punggol =

Singaporean autonomous public transportation service

- An Ai.R vehicle (left) and a Zig Driverless vehicle (right)

Overview
- Area served: Punggol, Singapore
- Locale: Singapore
- Transit type: Autonomous shuttle
- Number of lines: 3
- Line number: Route 1, Route 2 Lite, Route 2, Route 3 Mini, Route 3

Operation
- Began operation: 1 April 2026 (Grab) / 22 June 2026 (ComfortDelGro)
- Operators: ComfortDelGro and Pony.ai (Zig Driverless); Grab and WeRide (Ai.R)
- Number of vehicles: 16

The autonomous shuttle trial in Punggol, Singapore, is run by two main operators. Autonomously Intelligent Ride (Ai.R), operated by Grab and WeRide, runs Routes 1, 3, and 3 Mini. Zig Driverless, operated by ComfortDelGro (CDG) and Pony.ai, runs Route 2 and its shorter variant, Route 2 Lite. The trial began route familiarisation in 2025 before commencing passenger-carrying rides in 2026. There are plans to eventually expand the autonomous service to other areas in Singapore.

== Background ==
Autonomous public transport has been trialled and deployed in different areas of Singapore. Robobus, an autonomous shuttle service operated by WeRide, began operations in June 2024 at Resorts World Sentosa. Human operators, previously present on the service for safety reasons, were removed in July 2025. Trials for autonomous bus services have been conducted in one-north, Marina Bay, and Shenton Way.

On 4 February 2016, plans were announced in the Land Transport Master Plan (LTMP) 2040 to deploy autonomous buses in Punggol, Tengah, and the Jurong Innovation District, as part of a pilot programme. In 2019, the deployment of the autonomous vehicles (AVs) was confirmed to take place in the early 2020s.

== History ==
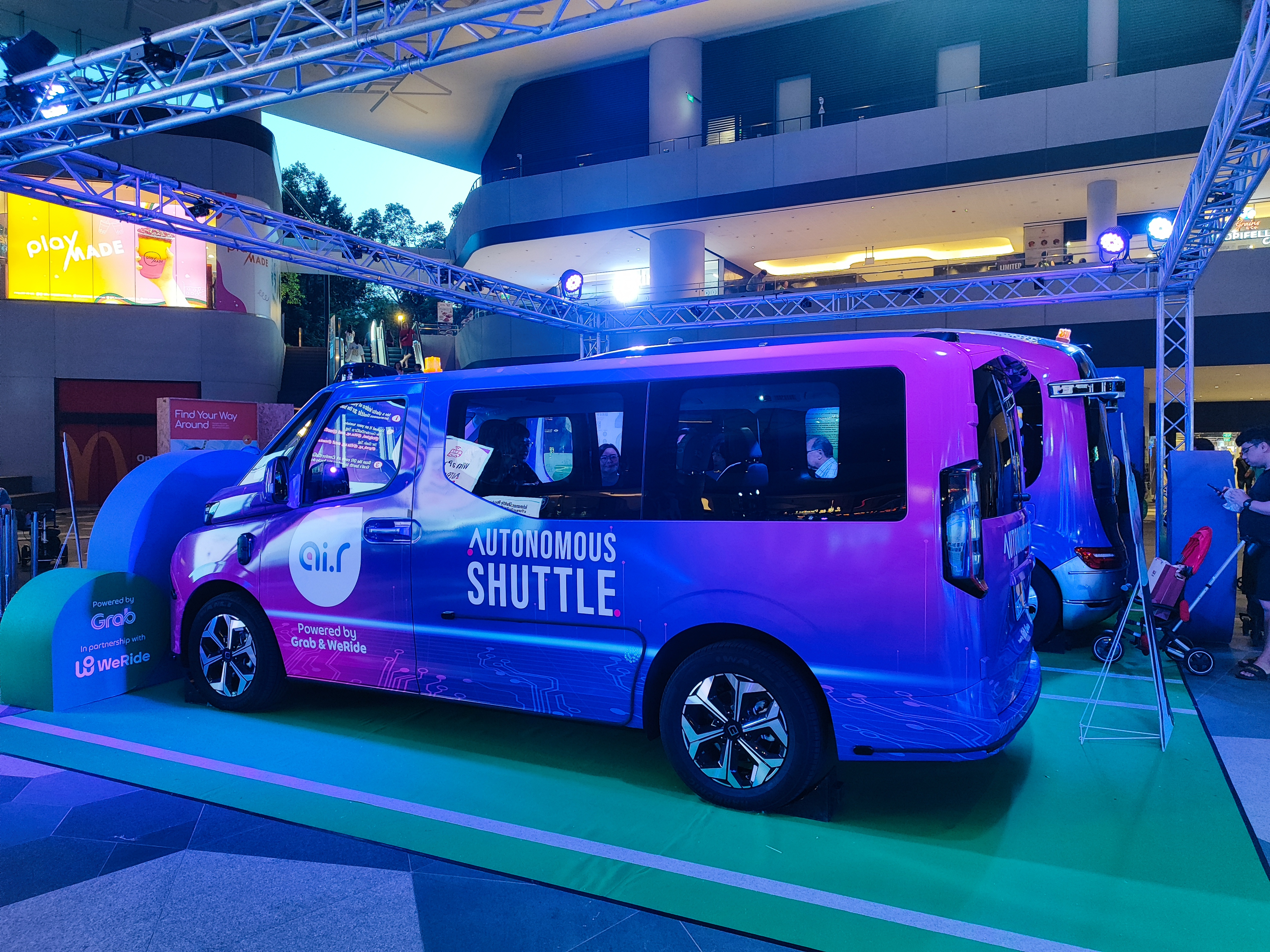
An Ai.R autonomous shuttle being displayed at a roadshow at the Punggol Digital District.

In June 2025, Acting Minister of Transport Jeffrey Siow, as well as Senior Minister of State at the Ministry of National Development and the Ministry of Transport Sun Xueling, also a Member of Parliament (MP) for Punggol Group Representation Constituency (GRC), went on a two-day visit to Guangzhou, China. During the visit, they visited autonomous vehicle companies, including WeRide, the Guangzhou Public Transport Group, Pony.ai, and DiDi. On 27 June, they stated plans to begin trialling the autonomous shuttles in Punggol in the fourth quarter of 2025.

In September 2025, Grab was selected as the operator for two autonomous shuttle routes in Punggol. Grab and ComfortDelGro also partnered with the Chinese autonomous vehicle companies, WeRide and Pony.ai, respectively, to begin autonomous shuttle services in Singapore in early 2026. Trials for the new shuttle services also began on the same month. During this trial period, the shuttles completed over 25,000 km of autonomous testing.

The Land Transport Authority (LTA) subsequently gave approval to Grab and WeRide to test 11 shuttles on two routes. The first AV testing was conducted in mid-October 2025.

On 12 January 2026, by-invite community rides (Note: A phase where selected stakeholders are invited to experience the service for free before it opens to the public, designed to gather data based on passenger feedback.) of the shuttles operated by Grab and WeRide began. Invitees included members of grassroots organisations, and winners of the SG60 lucky draw. During these trials, a safety operator would be in the vehicle at all times. According to the LTA, about 740 people had ridden on the autonomous shuttles during this period by 4 March 2026. All passengers would be insured in case of an accident.

On 4 March 2026, Jeffrey Siow announced that two routes of the autonomous shuttle services would be available to the public on 1 April 2026. A third route to be operated by ComfortDelGro was also stated to be in development. Plans were also announced to begin trials in other regions of Singapore, such as Sentosa, Tuas, and Mandai, if the rollout of shuttle services in Punggol is considered to be successful.

Registrations for the service operated by Grab and WeRide began on 25 March 2026.

On 1 April 2026, routes 1 and 3 of the autonomous shuttle opened to the public, alongside an express variant of route 3 called 3 mini. The service was made free-of-charge initially for a limited period of time. It was planned that the shuttle services would have a flat fare of S$4 starting in mid-2026.

On 7 April 2026, Pony.ai announced that they had received regulatory approval to begin by-invite community rides of the autonomous shuttles in partnership with CDG. Invitees included residents of Punggol. Trained safety operators remained in the vehicles during trials. Invitees can choose between two CDG routes. One route is a 12 km long loop, which has 7 stops, and takes about an hour to complete. The second route is a shortened variant of the same loop, and takes about 30 minutes to complete. The trials are free-of-charge.

As announced three days prior, Route 2 Lite, a shortened version of ComfortDelGro's autonomous shuttle loop serving three stops, began operations free of charge on 22 June 2026. This was followed by the launch of the full seven-stop Route 2 service on 1 July 2026. Branded as "Zig Driverless", it is the transport operator's second global autonomous public service, following a robotaxi pilot in Guangzhou, China. Passengers can book rides through the CDG Zig app or the BookingSG platform.

On 29 July 2026, the Land Transport Authority (LTA) and Grab announced a pilot program for on-demand autonomous vehicle (AV) services in Punggol. Moving away from fixed-route shuttle loops, the pilot allows passengers to book dedicated AVs that travel via direct routes between selected pick-up and drop-off points. This shift was introduced following LTA post-ride surveys. Among around 270 Punggol resident responses, almost 60% preferred choosing their boarding and alighting locations, while approximately 40% favoured direct routing to their destinations. The on-demand pilot was scheduled to open initially to trial riders before becoming available to the general public in the fourth quarter of 2026. This Q4 expansion marks the start of commercial fares, which had been delayed from their original mid-2026 launch date. During the pilot phase, Grab's existing fixed-route shuttle services continue to operate free of charge alongside the on-demand service.

== Operations ==
=== Routes ===
The Punggol autonomous shuttle network consists of three main fixed loop routes connecting residential blocks to amenities, including the Punggol Coast MRT station and Oasis Terraces. During the public trial phase, Ai.R (Grab and WeRide) operates primarily on weekdays between 9.30am and 5pm. Zig Driverless (CDG and Pony.ai) operates from Mon to Sun between 9.30am and 5pm, with Mondays and Fridays reserved for special assistance and group bookings.

Routes 1, 3, and 3 Mini, operated by Ai.R, and Routes 2, and 2 Lite, operated by Zig Driverless are in service. All shuttle routes are loop services.

Punggol Autonomous shuttle Routes
Route	Operator	Variant	Distance / Time	Booking method	Vehicle	Stops
Route 1	Grab & WeRide (Ai.R)	Full Loop	10 km	Walk-up boarding (No reservation needed, check app for arrival time)	WeRide GXR (5-seater)	Matilda Court (Blk 234), Punggol Clover (Blk 204A), Punggol Plaza, Oasis Terraces
Route 2	ComfortDelGro & Pony.ai (Zig Driverless)	Route 2 Lite	25 mins	Booking required (CDG Zig App) / Special Assistance or Group Booking on Zig Driverless website	Toyota Sienna (4-seater)	Northshore Plaza II (Blk 420A), Punggol Coast Mall (Bus Interchange), One Punggol (Sam Kee LRT Station)
Route 2	ComfortDelGro & Pony.ai (Zig Driverless)	Full Loop	12 km (50 mins)	Booking required (CDG Zig App) / Special Assistance or Group Booking on Zig Driverless website	Toyota Sienna (4-seater)	Punggol Plaza, Waterway Sunrise I (Blk 656A), Waterway Sunrise II (Blk 653C), One Punggol (Sam Kee LRT Station), Northshore Plaza II (Blk 420A), Punggol Coast Mall (Bus Interchange), Oasis Terraces
Route 3	Grab & WeRide (Ai.R)	Full Loop	12 km	Walk-up boarding (No reservation needed, check app for arrival time)	WeRide GXR & Robobus	Matilda Court (Blk 234), Punggol Clover (Blk 204A), One Punggol (Sam Kee LRT Station), Northshore Plaza II (Blk 420A), Punggol Coast Mall (Bus Interchange)
Route 3	Grab & WeRide (Ai.R)	Route 3 Mini	20 mins	Walk-up boarding (No reservation needed, check app for arrival time)	WeRide GXR (5-seater)	Punggol Coast Mall (Bus Interchange), One Punggol (Sam Kee LRT Station), Northshore Plaza II (Blk 420A)

=== Fleet ===
As of April 2026, Ai.R (Grab and WeRide) operates with a fleet of 11 autonomous vehicles. 10 of the vehicles are five-seater WeRide GXR electric vehicles, converted from Farizon SuperVans, while 1 is an eight-seater robobus. The vehicles have a bright purple livery, and an amber beacon on the roof. All used vehicles had passed Singapore's Milestone 1 (M1) assessment. Zig Driverless operates with five vehicles. These are five-seater minivans converted from Toyota Siennas.

The vehicles are able to use cameras and lidar to detect objects up to 200 metres in all directions, including in heavy rain. They are trained to adhere to Singaporean traffic laws.

=== Ridership ===
As of 12 July 2026, more than 11,500 unique riders had taken the autonomous shuttle services in Punggol.

== Incidents ==
- 17 January 2026 — At around 3.10pm, an autonomous shuttle operated by CDG undergoing testing collided with a road divider in Edgedale Plains, Punggol. As a result, the autonomous vehicles operated by CDG had a safety timeout during the investigation of the incident. The LTA later stated that the incident was caused by human intervention of the safety officer on board the vehicle. Investigations showed that the incident would not have occurred if there had been no manual intervention. No passengers were on board the shuttle when the incident happened, and no injuries were reported. As a result of this incident, CDG and LTA reviewed the operating procedures for transitions between autonomous and manual driving.
- 5 November 2026
  - A schoolgirl almost gets hit by a Grab autonomous shuttle, while crossing the road at Punggol Field Walk. The vehicle, which was testing a new route, did not stop before the pedestrian crossing while making a discretionary left turn, and the girl halted as the AV drove past her; a female was also seen pulling her away from the vehicle. The vehicle slowed down after the near-miss before continuing. A video of the incident was posted on Facebook, garnering over 260,000 views and 1,000 reactions. Preliminary data from investigations by Grab, WeRide, and LTA, showed that the vehicle had detected two pedestrians and was tracking their movement. When the child began crossing the road after the vehicle began making a left turn, the vehicle steered right and began braking, and the safety operator on board intervened by continuing to brake and steering it away from the pedestrian. LTA directed Grab to pause testing at such junctions until investigations are completed.
  - While a CDG autonomous shuttle was undergoing testing and performing a U-turn at a junction in Punggol Field, it started turning into the path of another vehicle. Both vehicles then slowed down. A video from the dashcam footage of the non-AV vehicle during the incident was posted on Facebook three days after the incident. LTA directed CDG to suspend testing of U-turns at the junction for their AVs following the near-miss, while investigations continue.

== See also ==
- Transport in Singapore
- 2026 in Singapore
- Artificial intelligence
- Applications of artificial intelligence
