= 2027 in Singapore =

- Decades: 2000s; 2010s; 2020s
- See also: Other events of 2027; Timeline of Singaporean history

The following lists events that have happened or will happen during 2027 in the Republic of Singapore.

== Events ==
=== Predicted and scheduled events ===
- 15 - 17 January – The first edition of Evo Singapore, the third overseas spinoff of the Evolution Championship esports tournament series, is scheduled to be held at Marina Bay Sands.
- February – The Johor Bahru–Singapore Rapid Transit System will open.
- 2 March – GV Yishun, also called Yishun 10 and is the oldest surviving cineplex in Singapore, is scheduled to be closed on that date.
- 31 March – Marina Square is scheduled to be closed on that date.
- June – 2027 FIBA 3x3 World Cup
- 13 - 15 August – The 2027 Pokémon World Championships is scheduled to be held in both Singapore Expo and Singapore Indoor Stadium.
- TBA – 2027 International Olympiad in Artificial Intelligence
- TBA – The Yu-Gi-Oh! World Championships 2027 is scheduled to be held in Singapore.
