= 2026 in Singapore =

- Decades: 2000s; 2010s; 2020s
- See also: Other events of 2026; Timeline of Singaporean history

The following lists events that have happened or will happen during 2026 in the Republic of Singapore.

== Incumbents ==
- President: Tharman Shanmugaratnam
- Prime Minister: Lawrence Wong

== Art and entertainment ==
- List of Singaporean submissions for the Academy Award for Best International Feature Film
- 37th Singapore International Film Festival

== Events ==
=== January ===
- 14 January – Parliament passes a motion to declare Pritam Singh unsuitable as Leader of the Opposition, with all Members of Parliament (MPs) from the Workers' Party objecting. Singh is then removed as Leader of the Opposition by Prime Minister Lawrence Wong the next day.
- 30 January – The Economic Strategy Review reveals seven strategies in their mid-term update to keep Singapore's economy moving forward, including four on boosting Artificial intelligence (AI) adoption and readiness, as well as several moves to reform risk-taking and get into new industries.

=== February ===
- 1 February – The Singapore Civil Defence Force sounds the important message signal from the Public Warning System at 1500 SGT for the first time instead of 15 February, to mark the start of Exercise SG Ready in times of crisis.
- 6 February – Six-year-old Sheyna Lashira Smaradiani is killed by a speeding car in Chinatown.
- 12 February – Prime Minister Lawrence Wong delivers a statement on Budget 2026 in parliament.

=== March ===
- 17–19 March – Prime Minister Lawrence Wong made his first official visit to Japan to mark the 60th anniversary of bilateral relations between Singapore and Japan.
- 31 March – The Equatic-1 seawater carbon dioxide removal plant began operations in Tuas, with an initial capacity of removing 1 tonne of CO_{2} per day.

=== April ===
- 1 April
  - The Autonomous Intelligent Ride (Ai.R), an autonomous shuttle service, begins public operations in Punggol, as part of autonomous shuttle trials in Punggol, with 2 main routes and 1 express "mini" route.
  - The National Space Agency of Singapore is set up, having been previously announced by Minister-in-charge of Energy and Science & Technology Tan See Leng on 2 February.
  - Singapore Food Agency announces a lifting of ban of exports of pig blood curd, now requiring approval from the agency itself. The ban was first imposed in 1999 in response to the 1998–1999 Malaysia Nipah virus outbreak.
- 10 April – Prime Minister Lawrence Wong and Australian Prime Minister Anthony Albanese sign a mutual energy supply agreement, with Singapore agreeing to supply refine fuel in return for Australia supplying liquefied natural gas.
- 13 April – Minister for Defence Chan Chun Sing unveils a new medical classification system that will replace the Physical Employment Standards, focusing instead on functional deployments and medical exemptions. The system will be rolled out from October 2027.

=== May ===
- 1 May – The Tobacco and Vaporisers Control Act, which increases the punishments for vape and tobacco offences, comes into effect. The maximum fine for vape users increases from S$2,000 to S$10,000, with longer maximum jail terms and mandatory caning for users, importers and traffickers of Kpods (a type of vape that contains etomidate). In vape cases, the onus is placed on the accused to prove that they did not know about the existence of vapes in their possession.
- 4 May – Prime Minister Lawrence Wong and New Zealand Prime Minister Christopher Luxon sign a "fuel for food" agreement to ensure a steady supply of essential goods such as food, fuel, construction materials and medicines in response to supply disruptions caused by the 2026 Iran war.
- 10 May – Singapore tests SG Alert, a Cell Broadcast System to enable delivery of emergency alerts to the public via mobile phones. The system starts with Singtel-linked lines.
- 13 May – The Economic Strategy Review releases their final set of eight thrusts spanning 32 recommendations, the latest being to enhance energy and supply resilience due to geopolitical shocks.
- 18 May – At about 5 am, 68-year-old Loh Hee Chen falls onto the train tracks at Segar station of the Bukit Panjang LRT line (BPLRT) and is pronounced dead at the scene by a Singapore Civil Defence Force (SCDF) paramedic. Train services between Senja and Bukit Panjang stations were disrupted for about four hours.
- 22 May – Lee Cheuk-hing, the principal of San Wui Commercial Society Secondary School in Hong Kong, argues with and swears at two Singapore security guards during an exchange programme. A viral video of the incident is posted onto Threads the next day, and he resigns from his position as principal of the school on 28 May.

=== June ===
- 1 June – Koh Poh Koon, Senior Minister of State for both Manpower and Health and MP for Tampines Group Representation Constituency (GRC), resigns from his positions as Senior Minister of State over "family matters". He remains an MP for Tampines GRC.
- 17 June – A fire breaks out at a hawker centre in Whampoa. 100 people are evacuated, with no injuries reported.

=== July ===
- 12 July – Circle Line Stage 6 opens.
- 14 July – The High Court of Singapore orders Bloomberg L.P. and its reporter, Low De Wei, to pay S$460,000 ($356,000) to Coordinating Minister for National Security K. Shanmugam and Minister for Manpower Tan See Leng following a lawsuit filed by the two ministers for defamation over an article regarding their property transactions, which is also ordered taken down by the court.
- 17 July – It is announced that Sundaresh Menon will step down as Chief Justice on 26 February 2027, with Sushil Sukumaran Nair taking over the same day.
- 20 July – Muhammad Faishal Ibrahim resigns from parliament and the People's Action Party due to personal reasons involving his conduct with a female member of the public.
- 22 July – Prime Minister Wong announces a cabinet reshuffle effective 27 July with three political office-holders appointed as full ministers, one returning back to represent NTUC, and one appointed an acting minister. Two new backbenchers are appointed into junior roles. Additionally, the Ministry of Trade and Industry is renamed the Ministry of Energy, Trade and Industry from 1 October to reflect the importance of energy resilience.
- 24 July – The United States imposes a 12.5% tariff on Singapore, citing the presence of alleged forced labour in the supply chain.
- 31 July – Details of Stage 3 of the Cross Island Line are unveiled with four stations, along with studies for a bus rapid transit for the Tuas area.

=== August ===
- 3 August – Singapore bars entry to two Massive Attack members after they showed a Palestinian flag and expressed support for the Palestinian cause at a concert.

=== September ===
- 4 September – Air quality in Singapore reaches unhealthy range for the first time in 3 years, with 24-hour Pollutant Standards Index reading showing 123 in the central region by 10 pm.
- 8 September – Prime Minister Wong announces a salary hike for political officeholders, as well as Members of Parliament, Non-constituency Members of Parliament and Nominated Members of Parliament to allow salaries to keep up with market levels, the first in 15 years. These increments will take effect from 15 October.

=== November ===
- 9 November – A fire breaks out at Orchard Gateway at around 5:40 pm. 100 people were evacuated by the police and nobody was injured.
- 10 November – Authorities seize the cruise ship Villa Vie Odyssey as part of a court order amid financial problems involving its voyage.
- 12 November – National triathlete Russell Lee dies at the age of 24, after colliding with a tipper truck while cycling in Changi. The road accident was at least the third accident involving cyclists in eastern Singapore in less than two days.

=== Predicted and scheduled events ===
- 26 December – Bedok South, Sungei Bedok and Xilin MRT stations begin operations.

== Deaths ==
- 8 January – David Chia Kim Cheok, veteran singer and performer (b. 1952).
- 18 January – Liu Thai Ker, architect and former master planner of the Urban Redevelopment Authority (b. 1938).
- 6 February – Sheyna Lashira Smaradiani.
- 23 March – Eddie Kuo Chen Yu, Emeritus Professor at the Nanyang Technological University and Honorary Advisor at the Centre for Chinese Studies, Singapore University of Social Sciences (b. 1940).
- 30 March – Loh Heng Chew, former national table tennis coach and player (b. 1929).
- 16 April – Omar Bin Yacob Bamadhaj, drug trafficker who trafficked cannabis on 24 February 2021.
- 5 May – Ong Ah Heng, former PAP Member of Parliament for Nee Soon Central Single Member Constituency (SMC) (b. 1944).
- 18 May – Loh Hee Chen, retiree who fell onto the tracks at Senja LRT station.
- 26 May – Chua Bee Ting, 21-year old student allegedly stabbed to death in a lift at Choa Chu Kang.
- 6 July – Mikhail Benyamin, 24-year old gym instructor struck by lightning while swimming along Pasir Ris Beach.
- 10 July – Chua Mia Tee, artist of social realism (b. 1931).
- 15 July – Eric Cheong Yuen Chee, former PAP Member of Parliament for Toa Payoh Constituency (b. 1930).
- 18 July – Kenneth Jeyaratnam, 2nd Secretary-General of Reform Party (b. 1959).
- 27 July – Lim Soo Peng, former PAP Member of Parliament for Havelock Constituency (b. 1928).
- 15 August – Tang See Chim, former Deputy Speaker of the Parliament of Singapore and former PAP Member of Parliament for Choa Chu Kang Constituency (b. 1932).
- 17 August – Kenneth Chen Koon Lap, architect and former PAP Member of Parliament for Hong Kah GRC (b. 1940).
- 24 September – Moses Tay, Anglican clergyman and 7th Bishop of Singapore (b. 1938).
- 6 November – Lee Yiok Seng, former Senior Parliamentary Secretary to the Ministry of National Development and former PAP Member of Parliament for Bukit Panjang Constituency and Sembawang GRC (b. 1939).
- 12 November – Russell Lee, Nanyang Technological University (NTU) triathlete who represented Singapore.
