= Tan Kue Kim =

Singaporean chef and restaurateur (died 2024)

- Born: 1945 or 1946
- Died: 14 February 2024 (aged 78)
- Children: 3

Tan Kue Kim (Chinese: 陈贵金; pinyin: Chén Guìjīn; Pe̍h-ōe-jī: Tân Kùi-kim; 1945/1946 – 14 February 2024) was a Singaporean chef and restaurateur who specialised in Hokkien mee.

== Early life ==
Tan grew up in an impoverished household in Bedok; his father worked at a rubber plantation. Tan dropped out of primary school in his fifth year to assist his uncle in his food business.

== Career ==
Under the guidance of his eldest cousin, Tan began frying Hokkien mee (a Singaporean noodle dish) in the 1960s. He established his first Hokkien mee stall in 1971, before starting his own restaurant in 1986 whose expanded menu featured items such as black pepper crab and fish maw soup.

Tan became known for cooking while wearing a long-sleeved shirt and a S$40,000 gold Rolex watch, which earned him the moniker "kim chiu pio" (金手錶; kim chhiú-pio; "golden watch" in Hokkien). The New Paper writer Abdul Shukor claimed that Tan was "one of Singapore's best known and most successful hawkers." Local food critic Margaret Chan described Tan's Hokkien mee as having "a no-holds-barred punch", but without "the ensuing feeling of surfeit" associated with other versions of the dish that involve generous portions of lard.

In 1989, Tan opened Kim's Seafood Restaurant in Geylang, which ceased operations in 1996. He subsequently relocated his business to Ang Mo Kio, before settling down for good at Jalan Eunos in 2002. In 2017, Tan was listed by KF Seetoh as one of the "Top 50 World Street Food Masters".

== Personal life ==
Tan was a car enthusiast who owned several sports cars in his lifetime, including a Lotus Esprit. He was married and had two sons, one daughter, and four grandchildren. Tan lived with his family in a three-storey semi-detached house in Lorong Mydin in Changi Road. On 14 February 2024, Tan died of a heart attack, aged 78.
