= Hin Leong =

Singapore oil trading company

Hin Leong Trading was a commodity trading corporation registered and headquartered in Singapore that was founded in 1963 by Lim Oon Kuin. One of Singapore's largest independent oil traders, the firm collapsed in 2020 amid allegations of $800 million in undisclosed losses. Hin Leong filed for bankruptcy protection in April 2020.

== Operations ==
In December 2010, Hin Leong announced plans to build Singapore's fourth oil refinery. In 2014, the company announced plans to file for an initial public offering (IPO) but cancelled those plans by the end of the same year.

== Bankruptcy and criminal conviction ==
When the outbreak of SARS-CoV-2 in Wuhan was first announced, Lim believed that the Chinese government would effectively contain it and therefore made the "quintessential Hin Leong play" of betting that oil prices would rise as a result of a recovering demand for oil. However, as the coronavirus crisis worsened into a pandemic and amidst plunging crude oil prices, the company faced pressure to make partial loan repayments amounting to billions of dollars; despite selling off oil pledged as collateral, the company was still unable to raise enough money to pay down its loans. In a meeting with its lenders, Lim revealed that the company had written off $800 million in futures trading losses, although it had declared a revenue of $20 billion and a net income of close to $80 million in the 2019 financial year.

The company owes $3.85 billion to 23 lenders, with its largest debt, $600 million, owed to HSBC. Singapore's three largest banks also faced significant debt exposure to Hin Leong; UOB was owed $100 million, whereas OCBC and DBS Bank had exposures of $200 million and $290 million respectively. Having initially filed for bankruptcy protection under Section 211B of Singapore's Companies Act with the High Court of Singapore on 17 April 2020, Hin Leong subsequently sought for "judicial management" under independent accounting firm PricewaterhouseCoopers (PwC), which would oversee the restructuring of Hin Leong's debt. The bid was approved on 27 April.

Lim resigned from Hin Leong on 17 April 2020, while stating that he wished for his children to remain as directors of the company. On 21 April, the Singapore Police Force confirmed that an investigation of Hin Leong was underway. Four months later, Lim was charged with forgery, on 14 August.

In a 2020 joint statement, the Monetary Authority of Singapore (MAS), Enterprise Singapore (ESG) and the Maritime and Port Authority of Singapore (MPA) said that they were also "closely monitoring developments related to the firm and the broader oil trading and bunkering sectors".

Singapore filed 105 additional charges against Lim in June 2024. In September 2024, Lim agreed to pay about $3.59 billion to his company liquidators and creditor HSBC; he and his children, Evan Lim Chee Meng and Lim Huey Ching, will also each file for personal bankruptcy.

On 18 November 2024, Lim Oon Kuin was sentenced to 17 years and 6 months of jail for three charges of cheating and forgery. The prosecutors described the case as “one of the most serious cases of trade financing fraud that have ever been prosecuted in Singapore”.

On 4 March 2026, his appeal against his conviction and sentence was partly successful, with his jail term reduced to 13 years and 6 months. His sentence was due to begin on 1 April 2026, with him being out on S$4 million bail due to medical reasons.

On 28 March 2026, he was hospitalised after having health problems. As a result, his bail was extended until 2 April 2026. He was taken into custody at Gleneagles hospital later that day.
