= Suicide of Uvaraja Gopal =

Singaporean police sergeant (died 2023)

Uvaraja Gopal was a Singaporean police sergeant in Singapore who died of suicide on the 21st of July, 2023, at the age of 35, allegedly after enduring workplace bullying and racial discrimination. At the time of his death, he was undergoing three criminal and disciplinary investigations. The case garnered widespread media attention in Singapore, with several calls for an independent inquiry into the incident, including by activist Constance Singam, and over 1,000 signatures on an online petition.

== Background ==
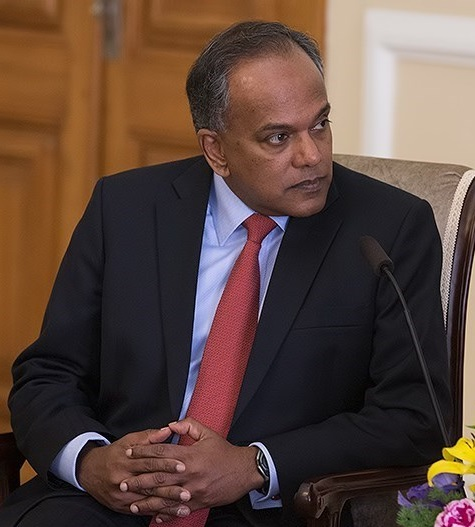
Shanmugam in 2014.

Gopal, who was of Indian origin, claimed to have been mistreated and racially discriminated against by his colleagues and superiors at while working as a police officer in Singapore for over 10 years. In a now-deleted Facebook post, he claimed to have been subjected to ethnic slurs, bullying from supervisors, and being ostracised at work. Internal investigations in 2015 found that offensive language was used, but was not targeted at Gopal. The officer apologised to Gopal and he was offered the option of lodging an official complaint, which he declined to do. In 2019, Gopal claimed a superior had shredded his leave form and uploaded the act to a chat group; he admitted to doing so and was reprimanded. Investigations of other claims of various superiors using discriminatory and offensive language against Gopal were found to not be true.

In 2021, Gopal filed a complaint against officers vaping within police compounds, the results of which were inconclusive; in 2023, he filed a complaint of officers smoking in a different compound. The officers involved were referred to an Internal Affairs Office. Gopal claimed he received unfair performance appraisals, which affected his career. K. Shanmugam, the Minister for Home Affairs, found said that investigations found the allegations to be false, and that Gopal was given opportunities to apply for postings. At his request, he was transferred to six different work units in nine years.

Gopal claimed he was treated as an outcast, with nobody from the police division attending his wedding. Investigations found that he had only invited one officer, who was unable to attend after falling ill. Shanmugam claimed that investigations found that Gopal suffered from various personal issues, he frequently applied for medical leave for extended periods, and seemed to have faced psychological stresses and chronic insomnia since 2017. He also displayed symptoms of anxiety and depression. Gopal's supervisors organised counselling and psychological assistance for him from 2016, with the latest instance being in January 2023. In February 2023, he was shifted to another unit and showed signs of being mentally unstable; he was relieved from carrying firearms the same month due to safety concerns. On 13 July 2023, police responded to calls at Gopal's parents' residence, where he had allegedly assaulted his brother over financial matters. The next day, Gopal's mother lodged a report against him, saying she feared for her safety. Later in the day, Gopal's sister-in-law called police to report him being outside her house; he left after police arrived. Gopal served at the Ang Mo Kio Police Division at the time of his death.

== Death ==
On 21 July 2023, Gopal made Facebook post alleging that he had experienced racial discrimination and workplace bullying, and alluding that he would be dead by the time the post was published. Gopal died of suicide the same day, reportedly by jumping, at the age of 35. He was found motionless in an apartment block, and taken to the hospital while unconscious, later dying. At the time of his suicide, Gopal was under criminal investigation for offences under the Penal Code and the Protection from Harassment Act, and under two internal disciplinary investigations for disobeying orders; once in April 2023 when he left his uncompleted work unattended and refused to return to finish it, and once in July 2023 when he had left his home on multiple occasions despite being on medical leave.

== Aftermath ==
The Singapore Police Force announced it would investigate the claims made by Gopal following his suicide.

The case garnered widespread media attention in Singapore, with several calls for an independent inquiry into the incident, and over 1,000 signatures on an online petition. Singaporean politician Leong Mun Wai suggested appointing a Committee of Inquiry to investigate the matter, to which Shanmugam disagreed. Political party Red Dot United emailed all Members of Parliament calling to address the issue and recommending the formation of an Independent Committee to thoroughly investigate the claims.
