= Ajit Singh Gill =

Singaporean field hockey player (1928–2024)

- Ajit holding the torch during the 2010 Summer Youth Olympics

Personal information
- Nationality: Singaporean
- Born: 21 March 1928 Kuala Lumpur, Selangor, Federated Malay States, British Malaya
- Died: 16 January 2024 (aged 95)

Sport
- Sport: Field hockey
- Club: Singapore Indian Association, Singapore

Ajit Singh Gill (21 March 1928 – 16 January 2024) was a Singaporean field hockey player. He competed in the men's tournament at the 1956 Summer Olympics. Gill died on 16 January 2024, at the age of 95.

== Early life ==
Ajit Singh Gill was born in Kuala Lumpur in 1928. He was the oldest of 10 siblings. In 1953, his family moved to Singapore. While there, he attended Teacher Training College. During World War 2, he lived through the Japanese occupation of Malaya. He used to go Singapore on a train to buy goods from the now-defunct Sungei Road Market and then return to Kuala Lumpur. He used to cycle up to 80 kilometers to sell his things in the countryside to support his family. He was scrawny (thin) as a young boy and overcame his childhood asthma by playing sports in Kampung.

== Career ==
Ajit Singh Gill played hockey and cricket for the Selangor Indian Association from 1948 to 1951 and for the state of Selangor in 1950. He was a short corner specialist and played for the Singapore Indian Association from 1952 to 1975. In 1956, he then represented Singapore in the Melbourne Olympics. He switched to cricket in 1960s. He earned the nickname — “big-hitting Sikh”, because of hitting fours and sixes with ease.

He retired from coaching cricket and hockey in 1985. After that he played golf and race walk. He topped the ASEAN Senior Amateur Golf Championship in 1990 After 26 years, he won gold in the 5,000 meter race walk at the Asia Masters Athletics Championships on home soil.

In 2010, during the Singapore leg of the Youth Olympic Games torch relay, he was one of 2,400 torchbearers and the oldest among them.

== Death ==
Ajit Singh died on 16 January 2024, at the age of 95 due to end stage renal failure. According to his son, he had fractured his hip during the last February after a fall but it healed sufficiently in three months. However, later his health due to renal failure. At the time of his death, his wife (Surjit Kaur) was 92 years old; and his lineage consisted of 5 children, 10 grandchildren and 5 great-grandchildren.
