= Oh Ow Kee =

Singaporean busker (1943–2022)

Oh Ow Kee (1943 — 5 June 2022), was a Singaporean busker and former karang guni man, taxi driver and clothes seller who performed on Orchard Road by swinging long Woodball Woola chains around his waist and his neck.

== Busking ==
Prior to retirement, Oh had worked various jobs, including being a taxi driver, a karang guni man and a clothes seller.

After retiring, Oh began swinging Woodball Woola chains, which are long chains of beads, with his wife as a form of exercise. His first set of chains were gifted to him by his friend, who bought them in China. He initially made the chains for sale. He began busking outside the Ngee Ann City shopping centre on Orchard Road and at the Toa Payoh Stadium in 2006. His wife originally busked with him while singing Hakka songs. However, she stopped busking to take care of her grandchildren. He would swing long Woodball Woola chains around his waist and his neck.

== Personal life and death ==
Oh was married to Hew Lin Yin. They lived together in Toa Payoh. He had several grandchildren, and would teach a few of them how to swing the Woodball Woola chains. He owned about ten sets of Woodball Woola chains.

Oh died on 5 June 2022.
