= Lai Kui Fang =

Singaporean artist (1936–2022)

Lai Kui Fang 赖桂芳
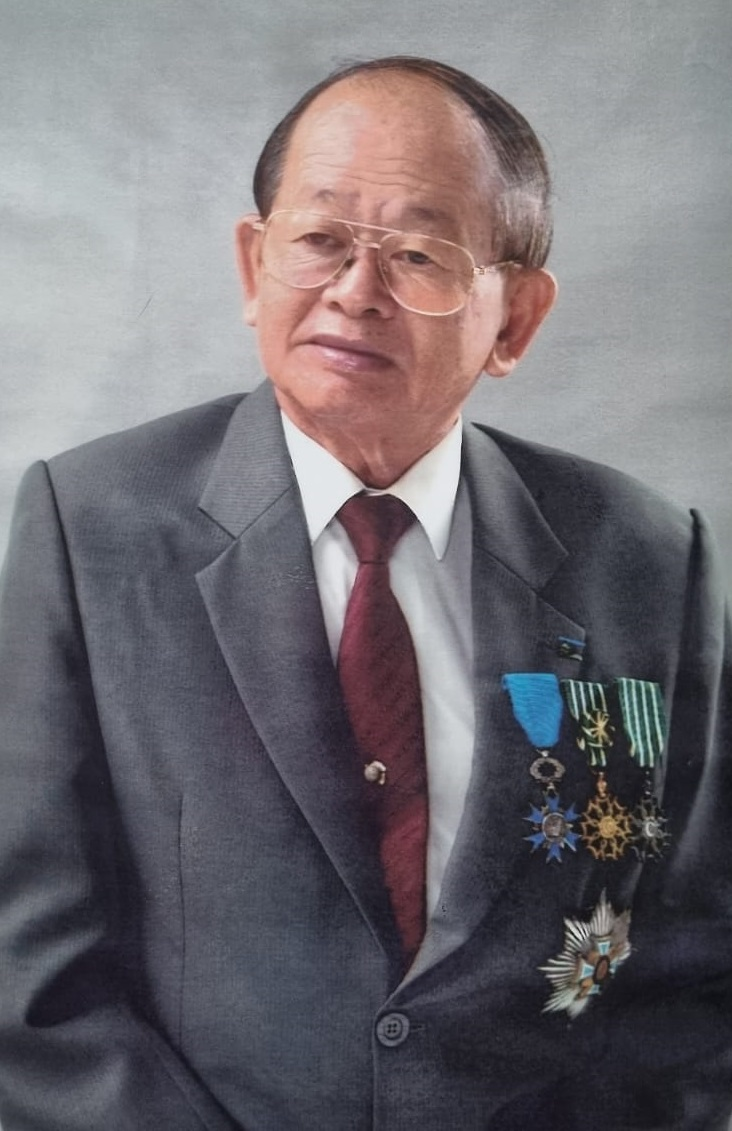
- Lai in 2008

Dr Lai Kui Fang

Personal details
- Born: 20 January 1936 Labis, Malaysia
- Died: 12 August 2022 (aged 86)
- Education: École des Beaux-Arts
- Occupation: Artist, Painter, Sculptor
- Known for: Historical paintings

Lai Kui Fang (simplified Chinese: 赖桂芳; traditional Chinese: 賴桂芳; pinyin: Lài Guì Fāng; 20 January 1936 – 12 August 2022) was a Singaporean artist who studied on a French government scholarship at the École nationale supérieure des Beaux-Arts.

Born before World War II in the mid-1930s, Lai's romance with art started peculiarly in the primitive environment of forests and jungles. Because of the war, the young Lai Kui Fang could only explore with charcoals as there were no pens or pencils available, he drew on the wooden walls of his home.

== Background ==
Lai, the son of a fruit hawker was born in Labis, Malaysia in 1936. He had two brothers as well as a younger sister. Lai was married to Leelee Koh. They were classmates in France.

Lai died on 12 August 2022, at the age of 86. He was survived by his wife, son and daughter.

== Notable works ==
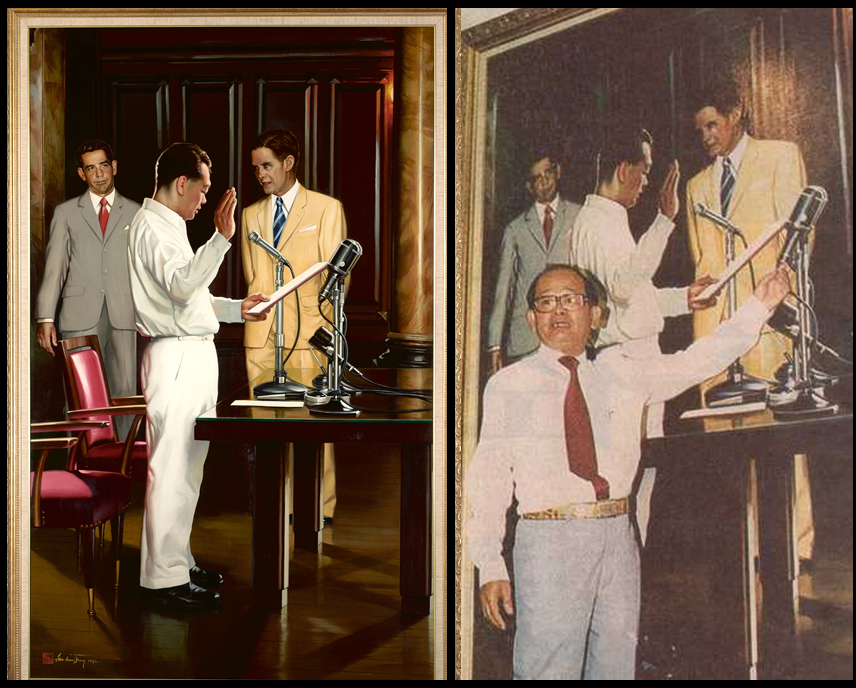
Lai expounding his completed work to the audience.

Lai was commissioned to paint the swearing in of Singapore's first Prime Minister Mr Lee Kuan Yew. As there were no photos to reference on. Lai depiction has to be referenced by speaking to those who were present. His re-creation of the landmark moment of 5 June 1959 is owned by the state and is often exhibited in state museums. In the same period, Lai also worked with pioneer minister S.Rajaratnam on a painting that captured the historical event which featured all the members of Singapore's First Government in one painting. Lai has been tasked during his life to paint various political leaders Which also includes the late President Ong Teng Cheong and the Indonesian President Megawati Sukarnoputri, and many more around the world according to paintings shown on his and government websites.

== Selected awards ==
- Gold Medal by Salon des artistes français in 1966
- Knight of The French Order of Arts and Letters by the French Government in 1968
- Grand Gold Medal of the City of Paris for his contributions to France in 1969
- Officer of The French Order of Arts and Letters by French Government in 1975
- Honorable Doctor's degree in Arts International foundation Albert Einstein in 1991
- Conferred as one of the World's Great Artist by The Review International Committee of China in 1993
- Knight in the National Order of Merit Culture by French Embassy Singapore for his intense and genuine interest in French Culture in 2007

== Career ==
In 1963, Lai won a government scholarship to seek advanced education at the "Ecole Nationale superieure des Beaux-Arts" in Paris, France. He excelled in figure drawing for 7 years and achieved excellent results. Lai was then recommended by Prof. Chapelain-MIDY for 5 consecutive scholarships. In 1969, he obtained the "Diplome Superieur des Arts-Plastiques". In the same year, he proceeded to learn sculpture under the tutelage of Professor Étienne Martin.

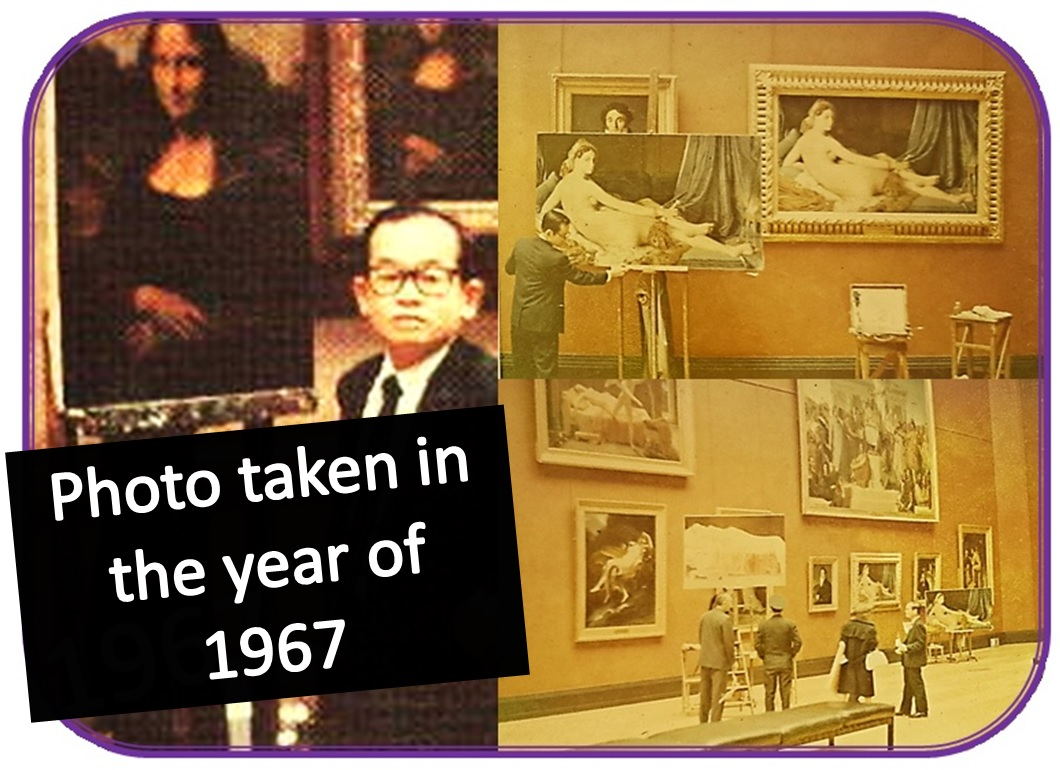
Lai at work on masterpieces as an official copyist and restorer of the Louvre

Lai's devotion to art was rewarded when he was engaged to research on the historical paintings at the Musée du Louvre, done by grand masters in the past, paintings like Leonardo da Vinci's Mona Lisa.He has made a few official copies of this masterpiece, selling them in 1970 for $10,000, and priced at $120,000 in 1983. The Musée du Louvre appointed him as the official copyist for reproducing the master pieces at the museum.

In 1966, he received the 1st Gold medallist from "Salon des Artistes Francais " In 1968, the Republic of France conferred him the knight of the French Order of Arts and Letters. In 1975, he was preferred to Officer of Arts, the highest honour bestowed by the government to distinguished masters of the arts. In 1969, he won the Grand Medal of the City of Paris which was granted to him in recognition of his contributions to France. In the 15 years Lai spent in France, he won 49 prizes, including gold & silver medals, decorations gazetted Arts Awards. In 1968 The Italian Government granted him a scholarship for advanced studies in Rome, The Lee Foundation also awarded him a 4-year study grant that year.

In Singapore, he took the top prize and merit prize for the First Defence Art Competition in 1991, among 176 entries from 119 artist, receiving his award from minister Dr Yeo Ning Hong.

An oil artist, Lai paints in the European classical culture. His portraits and landscapes bear the influences of the Old Masters and the great Romantics such as Goya, Rembrandt and Delacroix. His skills in restoring masterpieces, is sought after by museums and private collectors. Lai has also developed new techniques of restoring paintings damaged by heat.

Lai was also a sculptor, working with bronze, pewter, cement fondu, marble, clay and fibre glass. Over the years Lai captured the likeness of many foreign and local dignitaries and personalities in his sculpture and oil Portraits. He was also a souvenir coin designer for the Mint of Paris, specializing in Oriental figures.

In 1991, Lai obtained an Honorable Doctor's Degree in Arts from the Albert Einstein International Academic Foundation. In 1993, Pacific Western University, USA, bestowed a Doctor's Degree of Fine Arts on him.

The work of Lai Kui-Fang has been largely collected by national municipal and private collectors. There are 17 masterpieces in the Triton Museum of Arts in the US, 2 in City of Paris, 1 in City of Juvisy, France, 3 historical paintings and 7 others in the National Museum of Singapore. Canada, In 1972, he was invited by the Triton Museum of Arts for a Solo Exhibition.

Lai is listed in the French directories:'Who's who", The Human Value of Golden Book" (Le Livre d'Or de Valeur Humaines '70) Contemporary National Dictionary '68. In 1987, Lai was the first Singaporean to be invited to contribute poem cum calligraphy inscribed on the famous Henan Stone in Henan's Yellow River.

In 1990, Lai was invited to attend the First Taisan International Academic Symposium organized and funded by UNESCO. He was appointed to lecture on the restoration and the preservation of Fresco painting.

== Featured media ==
In 1971, his talents caught the attention of Reuters and the news agency engaged British Pathé to cover his exhibition on film at the Galerie de sèvres in paris. Reuters quoted Lai as an "extremely prolific artist".

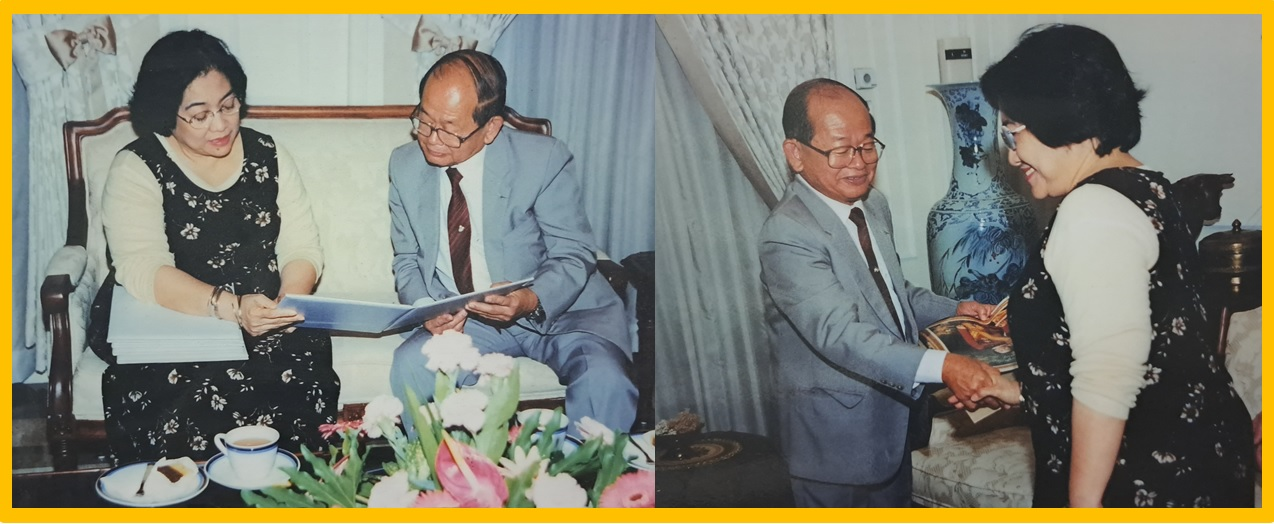
Lai was invited for tea with her excellency at the Istana Merdeka

In the year 2000–2001, Lai was commissioned to paint an official portrait of president Megawati Sukarnoputri of Indonesia. Upon the completion of the piece, Lai was invited to meet her excellency at the Istana Merdeka. He presented her with a gift of a beautiful painting of sunflowers. Her Excellency has often been seen speaking to guest at the istana with the portrait in presence.

In 2001, after the events of the September 11 attacks at the World Trade Center in New York, Lai immediately lifted his paint brush and spent 300 hours to depict and record this ground breaking tragedy. The painting stands at 4metres tall and 2metres wide, showing the aftermath of the chaotic situation right when the south tower was collapsing. Private collectors value this piece at US$1.5M back in 2002.

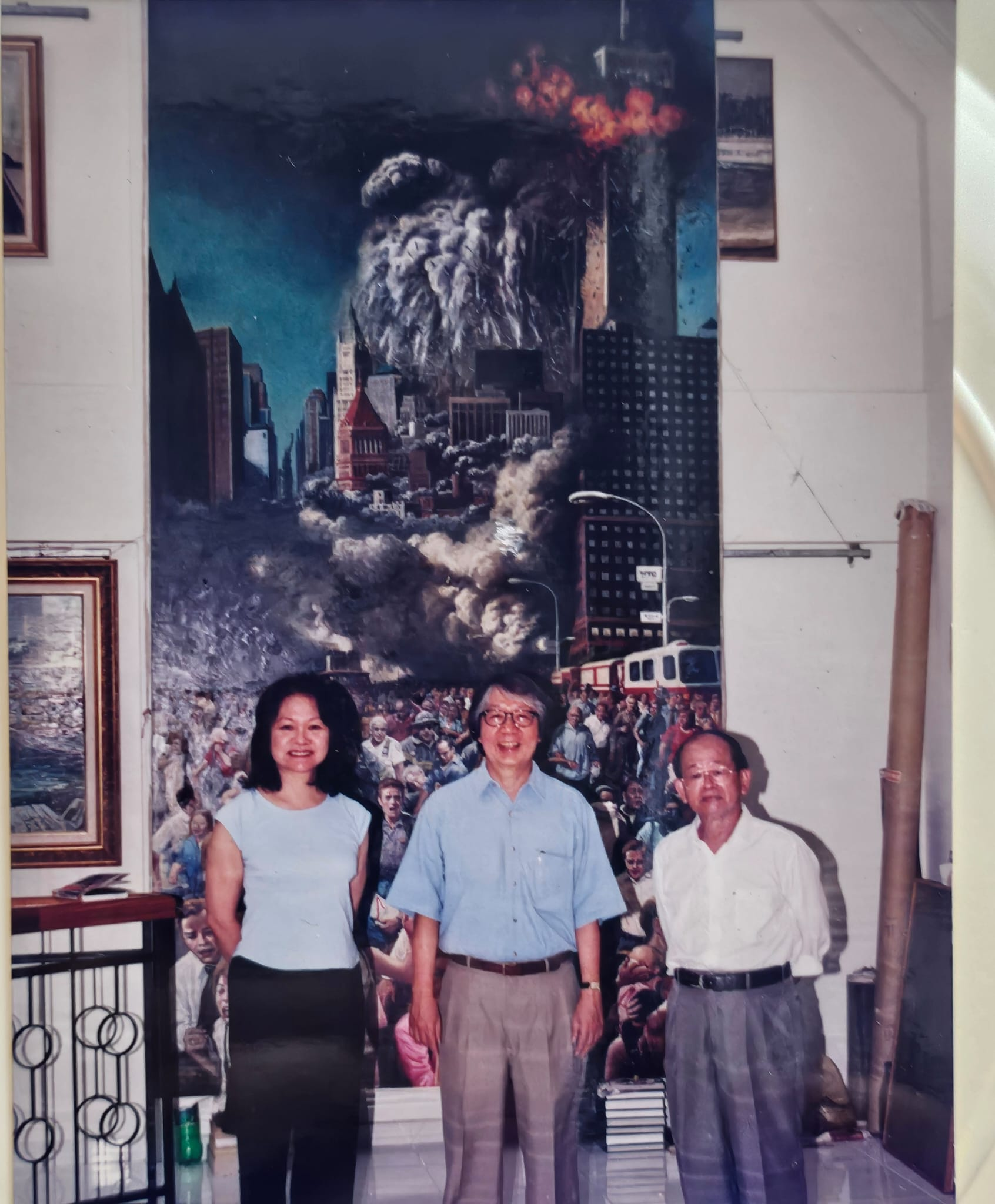
Singapore's Ambassador-at-Large Tommy Koh, gracing the completion of this majestic artwork
