= Disease Outbreak Response System Condition =

Disease crisis management plan in Singapore

The Disease Outbreak Response System Condition (DORSCON) is a disease crisis management plan in Singapore. The system is colour-coded reflecting the disease situation in Singapore. Beside showing the disease situation, it also outline the impact on the general public and what the general public should do.

== History ==
In 2003, after the SARS outbreak in Singapore, the Ministry of Health created the National Influenza Pandemic Preparedness and Response Plan which included DORSCON. DORSCON was first used during the 2009 swine flu pandemic in Singapore. The plan was further updated after the swine flu pandemic is over.

In 2013, then-Health Minister Gan Kim Yong announced a revised DORSCON framework. The framework now considers disease severity in addition to the spread of diseases in Singapore, thereby indicating the overall public health impact in Singapore. In addition to that, control measures are no longer hard-wired to each phase but are modular for MOH's continually assessment of the risks, hence making the framework more flexible with four colour alerts instead of five. This allows the framework to be used for both mild and severe diseases.

In 2023, Health Minister Ong Ye Kung announced plans to replace the colour-coded DORSCON framework with a 4-tiered public health situational framework.

== DORSCON levels ==
Level	Nature of Disease	Disease	Impact on Daily Life	Advice to Public
Green	Disease is mild or disease is severe but does not spread easily from person to person.	MERS, H7N9	Minimal disruption, e.g. border screening, travel advice.	Be socially responsible: if you are sick, stay home; Maintain good personal hygiene; Look out for health advisories
Yellow	Disease is severe and spreads easily from person to person but is occurring outside Singapore or disease is spreading in Singapore but is typically mild, i.e. only slightly more severe than seasonal influenza. Can be more severe in vulnerable groups or being contained.	H1N1	Minimal disruption, e.g. additional measures at border and/or healthcare settings expected, higher work and school absenteeism likely.	Be socially responsible: if you are sick, stay home; Maintain good personal hygiene; Look out for health advisories
Orange	Disease is severe and spreads easily from person to person, but disease has not spread widely in Singapore and is being contained.	SARS, COVID-19	Moderate disruption, e.g. quarantine, temperature screening, visitor restrictions at hospitals.	Be socially responsible: if you are sick, stay home; Maintain good personal hygiene; Look out for health advisories; Comply with control measures
Red	Disease is severe and is spreading widely.		Major disruption, e.g. school closures, work from home orders, significant number of deaths.	Be socially responsible: if you are sick, stay home; Maintain good personal hygiene; Look out for health advisories; Comply with control measures; Practise social distancing: avoid crowded areas

== Status change ==
- 28 April 2009, Raised from Green to Yellow.
- 30 April 2009: Raised from Yellow to Orange.
- 11 May 2009: Reduced from Orange to Yellow.
- 12 February 2010: Reduced from Yellow to Green.
- 22 January 2020: Raised from Green to Yellow.
- 7 February 2020: Raised from Yellow to Orange.
- 26 April 2022: Reduced from Orange to Yellow.
- 13 February 2023: Reduced from Yellow to Green.
