= Sophia Hull =

English writer (1786–1858)

Sophia, Lady Raffles
- Born: Sophia Hull; 5 May 1786; London, England
- Died: 12 December 1858 (aged 72); Highwood House, Highwood Hill, Middlesex, England
- Resting place: St Paul's Church, Mill Hill, Barnet, England
- Occupation: Writer
- Spouse: Sir Stamford Raffles (m. 1817; died 1826)
- Children: 5
- Writing career
- Language: English
- Genre: Historical
- Subject: Sir Stamford Raffles
- Notable works: Memoir of the life and public services of Sir Thomas Stamford Raffles, F.R.S. &c.; particularly in the government of Java, 1811–1816; and of Bencoolen and its dependencies, 1817–1824; with details of the commerce and resources of the Eastern archipelago; and selections from his correspondence (1830)

Sophia, Lady Raffles (née Hull; 5 May 1786 – 12 December 1858) was the second wife of Sir Stamford Raffles, who was a British colonial officer known for the founding of modern Singapore.

== Early life ==
Sophia Hull was born in Millman Street, London, England, the daughter of James Watson Hull and his wife Sophia (née Hollamby). She met Stamford Raffles in 1816 in Cheltenham, who had previously been married in 1804 to Olivia Mariamne Devenish. Olivia had died in West Java, Dutch East Indies, in 1814. There were no surviving children from this first marriage. Sophia married Stamford Raffles on 22 February 1817. She was aged thirty, her husband five years older.

== Married life ==
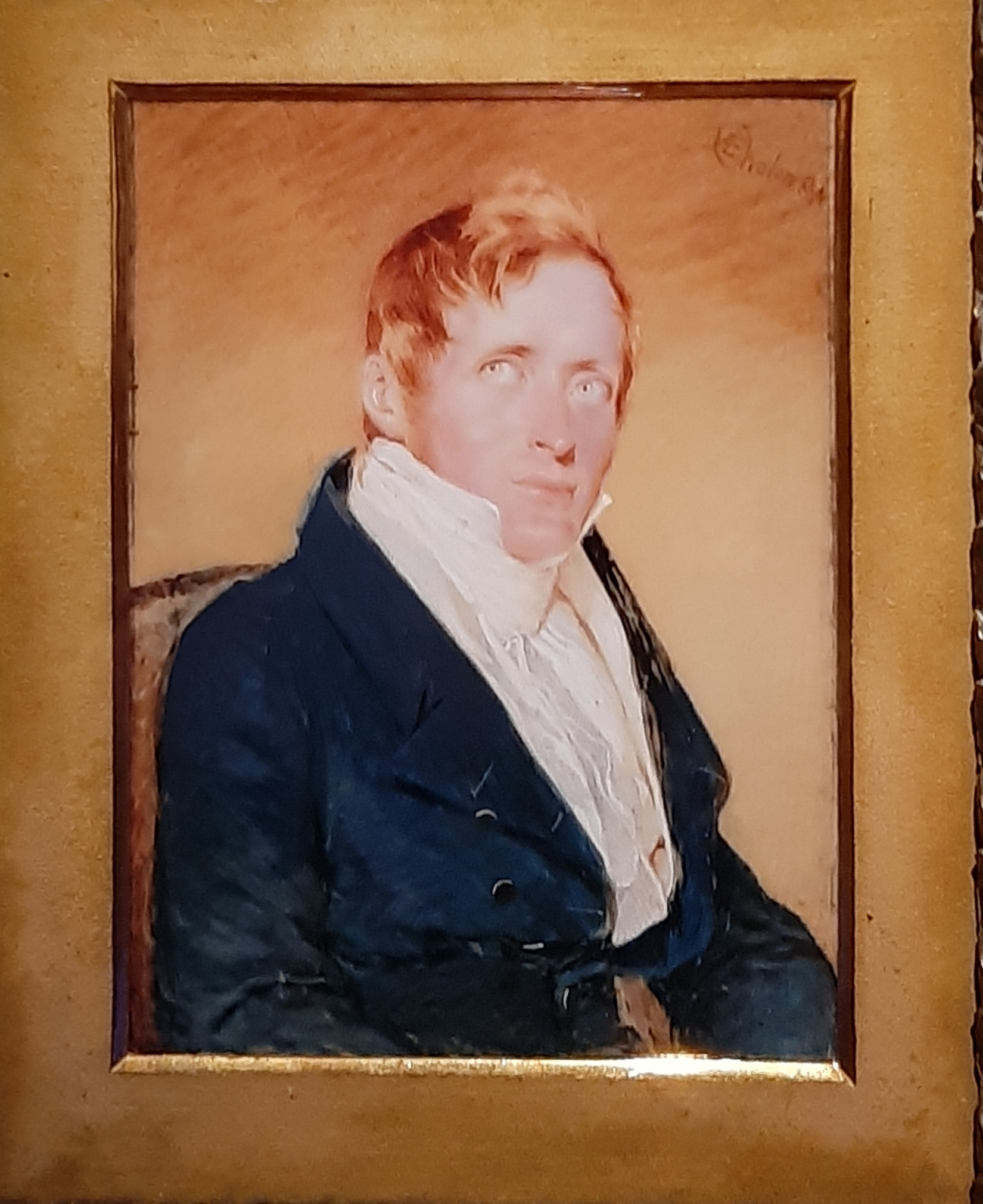
Miniature portrait of Sir Stamford Raffles, by Alfred Edward Chalon, c. 1817

Sophia had five children by Sir Stamford Raffles, two sons and three daughters:

- Charlotte Raffles (daughter) (1818–1822)
- Leopold Raffles (son) (1819–1821)
- Stanford Marsden Raffles (son) (1820–1822)
- Ella Sophia Raffles (daughter) (1821–1840)
- Flora Nightingale Raffles (daughter) (born and died 1823)

Her first child Charlotte was born on board ship during the voyage to Sumatra, Indonesia, made by the couple soon after their marriage. All their children succumbed to tropical diseases, and were buried overseas, apart from Ella, who was sent back to Britain for the sake of her health.

In 1825, Sir Stamford and Lady Raffles also returned to Britain. The seaward journey took nearly a year, having lost many of their possessions in a fire on board East Indiaman ship Fame, in which they barely escaped with their lives. Both were in poor health on board the ship Mariner by the time they arrived.

After her husband's death on 5 July 1826, Lady Raffles found she was in debt to the East India Company (EIC). She was nevertheless determined to write Sir Stamford's biography, which she did in the years that immediately followed. The first edition of Memoir of the life and public services of Sir Thomas Stamford Raffles, F.R.S. &c.; particularly in the government of Java, 1811–1816; and of Bencoolen and its dependencies, 1817–1824; with details of the commerce and resources of the Eastern archipelago; and selections from his correspondence was published in 1830 by John Murray III of the John Murray publishing house.

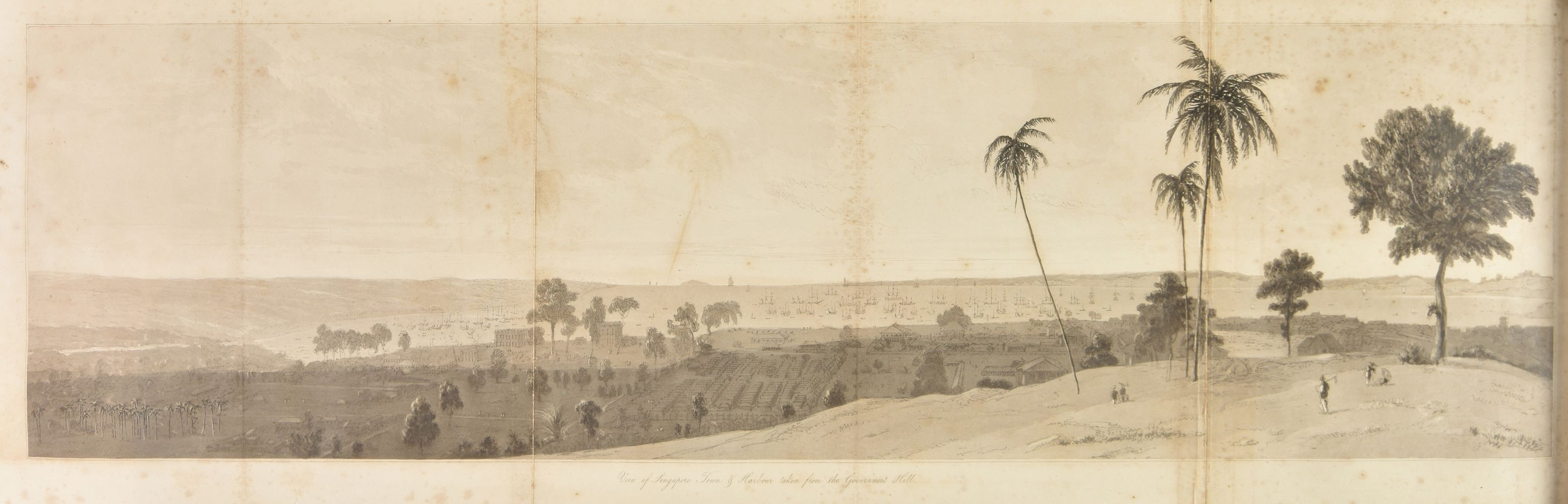
As probably seen by Sophia Raffles, a lithographic print of a view of early Singapore, looking seaward from The Hill (Fort Canning Hill) showing the area between Freshwater Stream (Sungei Bras Basah) and Singapore River. The view is likely to have been drawn a few years before 1830, when it was published in Sophia, Lady Raffles' Memoir of the life and public services of Sir Thomas Stamford Raffles.

Her remaining child, daughter Ella Sophia, became engaged to marry John Sumner, the eldest son of Charles Richard Sumner, the Bishop of Winchester, and nephew of John Bird Sumner, the Bishop of Canterbury. Ella met John when her mother Sophia spent time recuperating from illness at the bishop's home in Winchester. She and Sophia were particularly interested when Sumner was ordained as a clergyman during their visit. Ella and John were due to marry in the summer of 1840, but Ella herself was then taken ill, initially with a broken blood vessel. Having deteriorated over several months, Ella died on 12 May 1840, to her mother's despair. She was 19 years old, and Sophia's last living link to Ella's father, the late Stamford Raffles. Sophia's friend and former neighbour, Bishop Samuel Wilberforce (the third son of William Wilberforce), described the funeral:

. . . the deep sobbing of Lady Raffles and John was most affecting. Then Lady Raffles had to be removed: and it was almost too much. She clung to the coffin and kissed its repulsive blackness: saying in a sort of thrilling whisper of agony "My child, my child, my babe. Must I leave thee?"

== Death ==
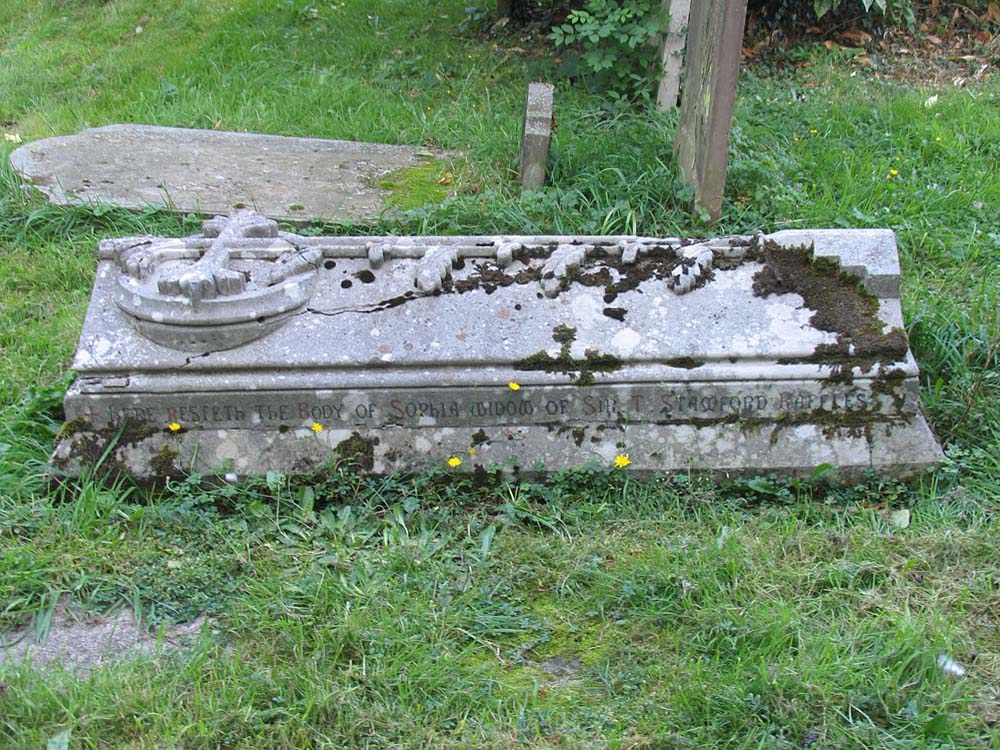
Sophia Raffles' grave at St Paul's Church, Mill Hill, Barnet, England.

Lady Raffles continued to live on at Highwood House in Highwood Hill, Middlesex. She died in 1858, aged 72. Lady Raffles was buried in the graveyard of St Paul's Church, Mill Hill. Following her death, her husband's heir, his nephew Rev William Charles Raffles Flint, tried to sell the collection of Sir Stamford's possessions, known as the 'Raffles Collection', to the British Museum in London; they declined to purchase it. However, Raffles Flint eventually donated the Raffles Collection to the British Museum.

== Bibliography ==
- Raffles, Lady Sophia; Raffles, Sir Thomas Stamford (1830). Memoir of the life and public services of Sir Thomas Stamford Raffles, F.R.S. &c.; particularly in the government of Java, 1811–1816; and of Bencoolen and its dependencies, 1817–1824; with details of the commerce and resources of the Eastern archipelago; and selections from his correspondence. London, England: John Murray (John Murray III). LCCN 14008180. OCLC 969520144. OL 18761069M. Archived from the original on 8 August 2016 – via Google Books.
