= Bust of a Chinese Gentleman =

1939 bust by William George Stirling

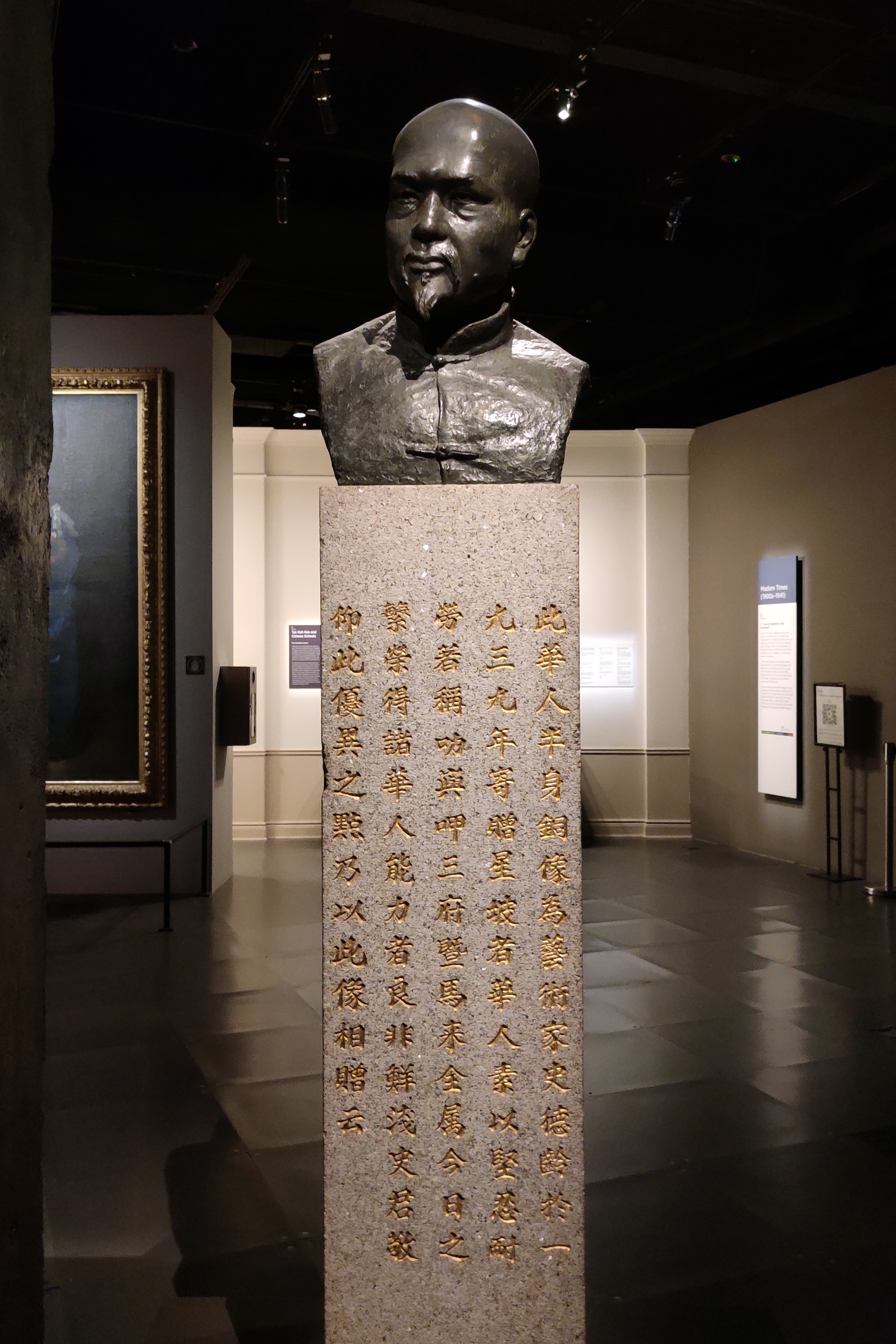
- The bust at the Port City exhibit of the National Museum of Singapore
- Artist: William George Stirling
- Completion date: 1939
- Medium: Bronze
- Subject: Stirling's idea of a prosperous Chinese merchant
- Location: National Museum of Singapore, Singapore

Bust of a Chinese Gentleman is a bronze bust of a Chinese man sculpted and donated to the National Museum of Singapore by the former Assistant Protector of the Chinese William George Stirling in 1939. The bust does not depict any particular subject as it was Stirling's idea of a typical successful Chinese merchant.

The sculpture first appeared in an interview with Stirling, where he was working on a clay model of a Chinese merchant. It was donated to the Raffles Museum (now known as the National Museum of Singapore) in 1939 by Stirling through the Friends of Singapore, where it was placed in the front lawn of the museum. In June 1985, the bust was stored as its proximity to a marked time capsule was deemed visually unappealing. Following some outcry by museum visitors, it was relocated to a driveway near its original site a month later. The bust was in storage during museum renovations in 2003 and reinstalled in 2013 in the Port City section of the Singapore History Gallery. Previously a "public work of art", it was reclassified as a "historical artefact".

== History ==
The bust was first mentioned in May 1937 when The Sunday Times interviewed William George Stirling, the former-assistant protector of the Chinese in Singapore, on his recent hobby of sculpting. It was reported that upon arriving to Stirling's flat, the interviewer found him "hard at work on a model of a Chinese merchant", with Stirling proclaiming that he will name the sculpture "A Chinese towkay" as a tribute to those who "[brought] development and prosperity to Malaya" with their "zeal, energy, endurance, and patience".

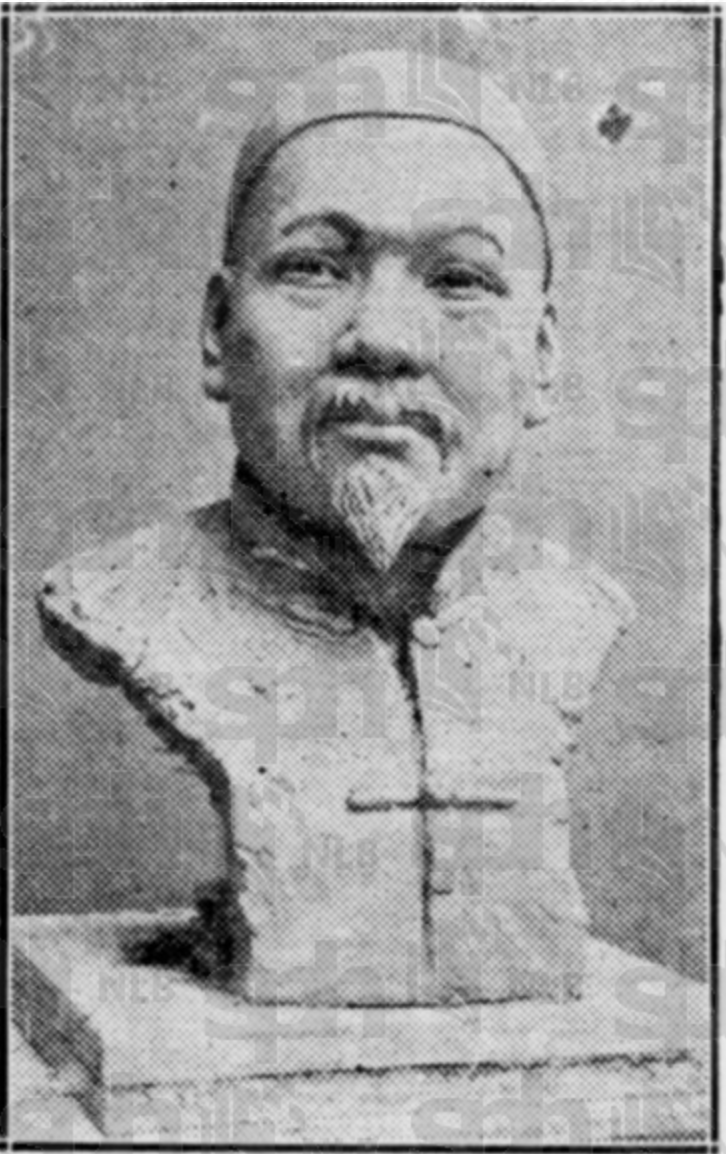
The model Stirling was working on

It was donated to the Raffles Museum (now known as the National Museum of Singapore) along with two other sculptures in January 1939 by Stirling through the Friends of Singapore. The bust was initially placed in the front lawn of the museum on 2 August of the same year. It was reported that visitors to the museum would be "baffled" by the sculpture due to its ambiguous nature, thinking that the subject is British colonial official Stamford Raffles despite Raffles' Bust being "about 60 yards (55 m) behind [it]". (Note: The article appears to wrongly attribute the subject of the bust to be William George Stirling himself)

In June 1985, the bust was removed and placed in storage because a circular marker for a nearby time capsule was deemed visually incompatible with the sculpture. Although the bust had drawn little attention while on display, its removal caused some minor uproar from museum-goers. A month later, the museum relocated the sculpture to a driveway 30 metres (33 yd) away using a crane mounted on a lorry, after an earlier attempt with a larger crane proved unsuccessful. In 2003, the bust was placed in storage during museum renovations. Clan leader Kua Bak Lim suggested that the Singapore Federation of Chinese Clans Associations display it at their Toa Payoh headquarters, but the plan did not materialise. A decade later, the bust was reclassified from a "public work of art" to a "historical artefact" and installed in the Port City section of the Singapore History Gallery.

== Details ==
Bust of a Chinese Gentleman is a bronze bust of a bearded Chinese man on a granite pedestal. The pedestal has an inscription in gold-painted Chinese characters, with an English translation at the back reading:

Given to Singapore in 1939 by the artist, W. G. Stirling, as a tribute to the people who have done so much by their great patience, endurance, and fortitude to bring the Straits Settlements and Malaya to their present state of prosperity

The bust itself also has an inscription that reads:

William Stirling, Singapore, 1901–1932

According to records from the Raffles Museum, it appeared that the sculpture is the second casting from a clay mould by Stirling, with the first one displayed at the Royal Academy of Arts in the United Kingdom. There were also two plastic molds presented to the museum. The bust was not modelled on a specific individual; rather, it represented Stirling’s interpretation of a typical prosperous Chinese merchant.
