= 1953 in Singapore =

- Decades: 1930s; 1940s; 1950s; 1960s; 1970s
- See also: Other events of 1953; Timeline of Singaporean history

The following lists events that happened during 1953 in Colony of Singapore.

== Incumbents ==
- Governor: Sir John Fearns Nicoll
- Colonial Secretary: Sir Wilfred Lawson Blythe (Until 30 July), Sir Wiiliam Goode (From 30 July)

== Events ==
=== January ===
- 18 January
  - One of three main water supply pipes near MacPherson-Aljunied Road junction burst, leaving 70,000 people without water.
  - Singapore experienced power outage for one hour when St. James Power Station broke down.
- 30 January – 450 attendants at Woodbridge Mental Hospital staged a strike, initially leaving 1,758 patients to the care of 30 nurses, the doctors and three volunteers. The strike ended on 5 February 1953, after negotiation between union leaders and Governor of Singapore Sir John Fearns Nicoll.

=== February ===
- 20 February – Record-breaking rainfall flooded several regions of the city-state, including Bukit Timah Road, Orchard Road, Tanjong Pagar and Kallang Airport.
- 23 February
  - John Eber, lawyer and Malayan nationalist, was released after two years of detainment by Singapore Special Branch in Changi Prison under emergency regulation and without trial.
  - The Finnish oil tanker Wiima, carrying 7,000 tons of jet fuels and bound for Communist China, was ordered to sail into Singapore waters by the British authority. The ship was eventually allowed to leave Singapore for Kokkola on 12 May 1953 after it sold its cargo to the US Navy ship USS Cahaba for a price of US$500,000 (about US$5.9 million in 2024 money).

=== April ===
- 9 April – Devan Nair, then former secretary of Singapore Teachers' Union, was released from more than two years of detainment on the St. John's Island under emergency regulation.
- 12 April – In an arbitration of wage dispute between the Government and the postal clerks, nearly 1,000 clerks were awarded 500 Malayan dollars, equivalent to 28 months of back pay. Lee Kuan Yew represented the workers during the arbitration.
- 21 April – The Government announced that, as part of the local government reform, the Singapore City Council will elect a mayor annually.
- 25 April – The Mahatma Gandhi Memorial Hall was opened by then British High Commissioner Malcolm MacDonald.
- 27 April – In an attempt to reduce recurring expenses, the Government required all new hirings to be approved by the Financial Secretary.
- 28 April – Two-third of the island's electricity supply was cut off for about 15 minutes due to a fault at the then new Pasir Panjang Power Station.

=== May ===
- 2 May – BOAC Flight 783, a Comet jetliner flying from Singapore to London, crashed near Calcutta, India after encountering bad weather, killing all forty-three passengers onboard.

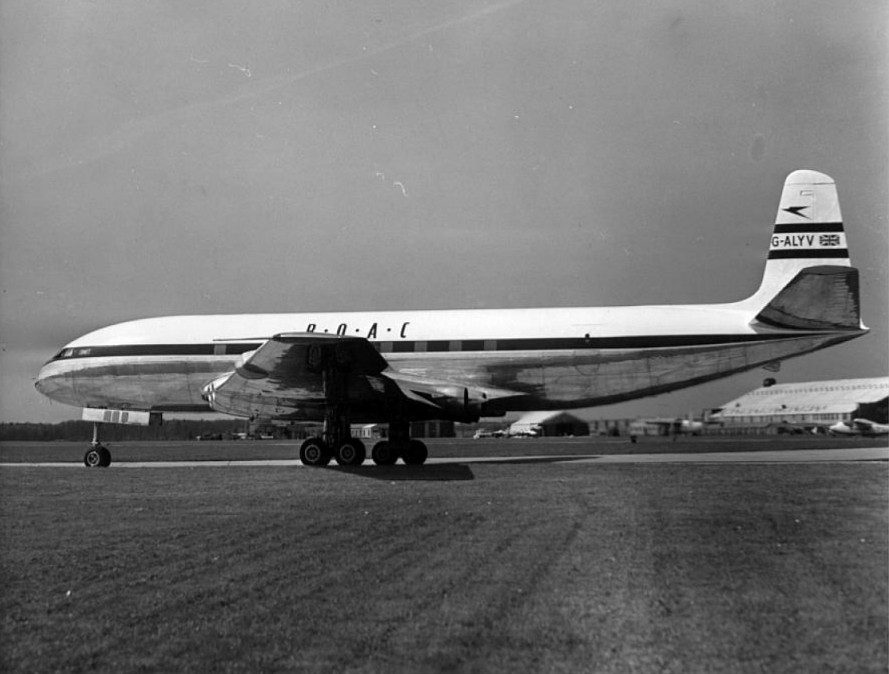
The Comet jetliner

- 10 May – The City Council announced that it is banning smoking in buses.
- 11 May
  - Parts of Singapore were without electricity for up to three hours in the evening due to a technical fault at Pasir Panjang Power Station and subsequent overloading at St James Power Station.
  - The Governments of Singapore and British Malaya appointed a joint committee, headed by Commissioner-General Malcolm MacDonald, to make recommendations for unification.
- 14 May – The Royal Navy exploded 50 tons of bombs in the waters near Pulau Tekong. The explosives were dumped into the sea by the surrendering Japanese army in August 1945.
- 19 May – The Government announced that government officers can voluntarily retire at the age of 45.
- 25 May – The Singapore Customs Department seized 1.5 tons of opium hidden in a lorry around the Orchard Road area.
- 27 May – A postman was sentenced to 18 months' jail after hundreds of undelivered letters and thousands of foreign stamps were found in his home.
- 30 May – 6 June: Singapore celebrated the coronation of Elizabeth II with a week of festivities.

=== June ===
- 7 June – A fire destroyed a block of shops and apartments in New Bridge Road, leaving 40 people homeless.
- 8 June – The 1,546-seat Odeon Theatre opened on North Bridge Road.
- 9 June
  - The Government said that as a measure to curb the spread of rabies, 7,397 dogs have been vaccinated and 1,051 stray dogs have been shot since May.
  - The Government announced that the 1951 limitation of building above 50,000 Malayan dollars will not be renewed.
- 12 June – The Government announced that it plans to introduce modern prison reform in the colony. The planned measures include segregating inmates by the length of their sentences and setting up discharge camps for inmates with less than 3 months of sentence left.
- 15 June – The electoral roll for the Colony's Legislative Council and City Council closed with just over 74,000 voters.
- 16 June
  - The Legislative Council approved the principle of extending the residential qualification of city councillors from three to seven years.
  - The Government announced that it is adopting a new pay structure for its 16,000 workers according to recommendations from the Ritson Report.
- 19 June – The City Council announced that it will ban fresh meat hawker on the streets from 1954, affecting about 1,000 hawkers.
- 20 June – Singapore Association for the Blind announced that, with a badge, blind people can now travel free on buses operated by eight Chinese companies.
- 25 June
  - Malaysian Chinese Association announced that it will end all welfare and social programs due to the Government's ban on lottery organized by political organization.
  - Singapore Rural Board agreed to license private markets in rural area due to a lack of government markets.
- 29 June – The City Council published its administration report for 1952.
- 30 June – The City Council announced that Taximeter will be compulsory for all taxis starting from 1954.

=== July ===
- 1 July – K. M. Byrne was charged with two charges of gross insubordination and breaking the General Order for deriding the incompetence of his expatriate colleagues during his campaign against a new family allowance given to expatriates but not local civil servants. On 22 July, he was found not guilty and got off with a reprimand.
- 3 July – The Pasir Panjang Power Station was officially opened by Governor Sir John Fearns Nicoll.
- 6 July – Beatty Secondary School was officially opened.
- 7 July – A fire destroyed a row of six two-storey houses in New Market Road and rendered 50 people homeless.
- 16 July – A fire destroyed a shanty town in Geylang area, rendering 4,000 people homeless.
- 20 July – The Custom seized two thousand pounds of opium near the junction of Kallang Road and Mountbatten after a car chase with a lorry.
- 21 July – The Governor, Sir John Fearns Nicoll, appointed a nine-man commission headed by Sir George William Rendel to review the constitution of the Colony.
- 25 July – The City Council's building committee announces that unauthorised newly-built houses will get neither water nor light.
- 28 July
  - A Royal Air Force transport plane from Singapore crashed near Kai Tak Airport in Hong Kong. One Chinese farmer near the crash site was killed. There were no casualties among the crew and the passengers.
  - The Singapore UMNO leaders were announced.

=== September ===
- 27 September – The Singapore Improvement Trust (SIT) announced it would build Singapore's first satellite town, Queenstown with the construction of Queenstown's first estate, Princess Margaret Estate, which started work last year on July 1952.

=== December ===
- 8 December – The colonial government issued a white paper titled Chinese Schools Bilingual Education and Increased Aid, proposing the introduction of bilingual education in Chinese schools in exchange for increased financial aid. The white paper was met with criticism from many Chinese schools.
- 31 December – Hock Lim Bus Company manager Guok Sing Inn is murdered after being shot to death in his office.

== Births ==
- 22 February – Alan Chan, former civil servant.
- 27 March – Ho Ching, former CEO of Temasek Holdings.
- 24 April – Kwek Leng Joo, prominent businessman, photographer and philanthropist (d. 2015).
- 24 June – Charles Chong, former Deputy Speaker of the Parliament of Singapore.
- 27 December – Tsao Chieh, composer and engineer (d. 1996).

=== Dates unknown ===
- Zeng Guoyuan, businessman, philanthropist, author, acupuncturist and perennial candidate (d. 2019).
- Lim Keng Peng, criminal (d. 1988).
- Mohamed Yasin bin Hussin, criminal known for the 1972 Pulau Ubin Murder.

== Deaths ==
- 1 January – Maganlal Gangaram, former President of the Singapore Indian Chamber of Commerce and director of Maganlal Nagindas & Co (b. 1905).
- 17 April – Yang Sin Hua, former Chairman of the Sam Kiang Huay Kwan and one of the founding Directors of the Overseas Union Bank (b. 1893).
- 29 October – Navroji Mistri, Parsi Indian entrepreneur and philanthropist (b. 1885).

== See also ==
- List of years in Singapore
- City of Singapore (historical entity)
