= 1950 in Singapore =

- Decades: 1930s; 1940s; 1950s; 1960s; 1970s
- See also: Other events of 1950; Timeline of Singaporean history

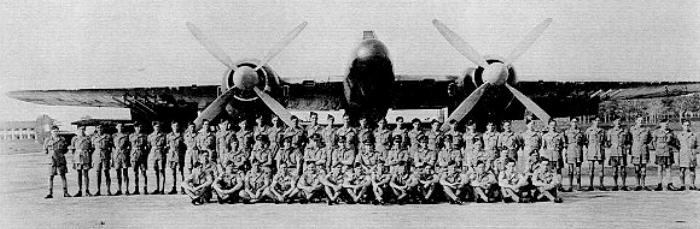
Members of No. 45 Squadron RAF in front of a Bristol Brigand aircraft at RAF Tengah, Singapore.

The following lists events that happened during 1950 in the Colony of Singapore.

== Incumbents ==
- Governor: Sir Franklin Charles Gimson
- Colonial Secretary:
  - Sir Patrick McKerron (till 29 April)
  - Wilfred Lawson Blythe (starting 30 June)

== Events ==
=== February ===
- 4 February – The Chung Khiaw Bank is founded.

=== March ===
- 1 March – The Teachers’ Training College (present-day National Institute of Education) is formed to train teachers. It is the first-ever training college for teachers.
- 6 March – A new postal district system dividing Singapore into 28 districts is launched, making it the first ever system.

=== April ===
- The Salmon's Maternity Home is opened.

=== July ===
- 3 July – The Singapore Tiger Standard was founded by millionaire Aw Boon Haw.

=== December ===
- 2 December – The 1950 Singapore Municipal Commission election is held.
- 11–13 December – The Maria Hertogh riots took place a few days after the verdict, worsened by inflammatory news coverage. The riots left eighteen people dead and 173 injured.

=== Dates unknown ===
- Changi Cottage is built.
- The Grace Assembly of God is founded.

== Births ==
- 4 February – Jufrie Mahmood, prominent opposition political figure.
- 17 February – Yu-Foo Yee Shoon, former politician.
- 5 March – Chay Wai Chuen, diplomat and former politician.
- 11 March – Rita Chao, former singer and actress (d. 2014).
- 20 March – Mohamed Latiff Mohamed, Malay poet and writer (d. 2022).
- 22 April – Seng Han Thong, former politician.
- 30 June – Kwek Siew Jin, former civil servant and former rear-admiral who served as Chief of Navy from 1992 to 1996.
- 4 October – Claire Chiang, entrepreneur, activist and former Nominated Member of Parliament.
- 17 November – Koh Boon Hwee, businessman.

== Deaths ==
- May 25 – Yong Yit Lin, former President of the Singapore Chinese Chamber of Commerce (b. 1897).

== See also ==
- List of years in Singapore
