= 1952 in Singapore =

- Decades: 1930s; 1940s; 1950s; 1960s; 1970s
- See also: Other events of 1952; Timeline of Singaporean history

The following lists events that happened during 1952 in Colony of Singapore.

== Incumbents ==
- Governor:
  - until 20 March: Sir Franklin Gimson
  - acting from 20 March - 21 April: Sir Wilfred Lawson Blythe
  - starting from 21 April: Sir John Nicoll
- Colonial Secretary: Sir Wilfred Lawson Blythe

== Events ==
=== September ===
- 25 September – Legislative Councillor for Seletar Constituency Vilasini Menon resigned due to being charged with a criminal breach of trust in India along with her husband.

=== November ===
- 19 November – Nomination day for the 1952 Seletar by-election.

=== December ===
- 6 December – The 1952 Singapore City Council election was held.
- 16 December – Independent candidate Madai Puthan Damodaran Nair was sworn in as legislative councillor for Seletar Constituency in an uncontested walkover.

== Births ==
- 10 February – Lee Hsien Loong, 3rd Prime Minister of Singapore.
- 25 February – Henry Thia, actor and comedian.
- 23 March – Anita Sarawak, singer and entertainer.
- 19 June – Richard Low, actor.
- 15 October – Ramli Sarip, musician, singer, songwriter, arranger and record producer.
- 3 December – Wan Azizah Wan Ismail, 12th Deputy Prime Minister of Malaysia.
- 22 December – Ahmad Magad, former PAP MP for Pasir Ris–Punggol GRC.

== Deaths ==
- 1 April – M. D. P. Gilroy, prominent amateur stage magician (b. 1902).
- 8 May – René Onraet, 9th Inspector-General of the Straits Settlements Police Force (b. 1887).
- 1 July – Ng Sing Phang, Cantonese community leader, businessman and philanthropist (b. 1873).
- 20 October – Wong Peng Shing, Cantonese community leader and businessman (b. 1905).
- 14 December – Lim Soo Ban, Hakka community leader and businessman (b. 1886).

== See also ==
- List of years in Singapore
