= 1951 in Singapore =

- Decades: 1930s; 1940s; 1950s; 1960s; 1970s
- See also: Other events of 1951; Timeline of Singaporean history

The following lists events that happened during 1951 in the Colony of Singapore.

== Incumbents ==
- Governor: Sir Franklin Gimson
- Colonial Secretary: Sir Wilfred Lawson Blythe

== Events ==
=== April ===
- 10 April – The 1951 Singaporean general election is held.

=== September ===
- 22 September – Singapore is proclaimed a City of the British Commonwealth by a royal charter issued by King George VI.

=== December ===
- 1 December – The 1951 Singapore City Council election is held.

== Births ==
- 5 May – Rex Goh, Singapore-born Australian rock guitarist.
- 2 August – Chin Tet Yung, former PAP Member of Parliament for Sembawang GRC.
- 22 August – Moses Lee Kim Poo, former civil servant.
- 4 October – Claire Chiang, entrepreneur, activist and former Nominated Member of Parliament.
- Cheo Chai Chen, former SDP Member of Parliament for Nee Soon Central SMC (d. 2024).

== Deaths ==
- 8 January – Pang Cheng Yean, director of the United Chinese Bank Ltd and Batu Pahat Bank Ltd and father-in-law of Lim Kim San (b. 1889).
- 13 January – Aw Hoe, managing director of the Singapore Tiger Standard and Sin Chew Jit Poh (b. 1919).
- 9 February – Harold Wolskel, former Municipal Commissioner of the Singapore Municipal Commission (b. 1871).
- 14 July – Andrew Caldecott, 17th Colonial Secretary of the Straits Settlements (b. 1884).
- 11 October – William G. Stirling, former Assistant Protector of the Chinese in Singapore (b. 1887).
- 13 December – Laurence Guillemard, 18th Governor of the Straits Settlements (b. 1862).

== See also ==
- List of years in Singapore
- City of Singapore (historical entity)
- City Council of Singapore
