= G. C. Davies =

Welsh educator (1893–1932)

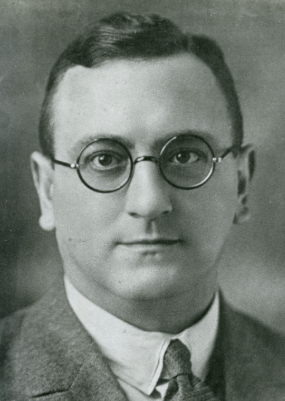
Davies in the 1930s.

Gwilym Coleshill Davies (1893 – 20 January 1932) was a prominent educator and civil servant active in British Malaya in the 1920s and early 1930s. He served as the headmaster of the Victoria Institution in Kuala Lumpur from 1926 to 1930 and of the Raffles Institution in Singapore from 1931 to 1932.

== Early life, education and WWI ==
Davies was born in Wales in 1893. He was the son of William Davies, station master at Conway. He attended the Friars School in the city of Bangor in Gwynedd, Wales, before furthering his education at the Jesus College of the University of Oxford, graduating with a Master of Arts degree in 1919. He then went to St. Cuthbert's in Malvern, Worcestershire.

Davies served in the 6th (Caernarvonshire and Anglesey) Battalion, Royal Welch Fusiliers in World War I, being appointed a second lieutenant on 6 March 1915. He saw action in Salonica and joined the Indian Army Reserve of Officers as a captain. In this period, while returning to Wales on leave, the ship Davies was travelling on was torpedoed. He spent several hours adrift before he was rescued. He was conferred the Military Cross on 1 February 1918 for having "led his company with great courage during an attack."

== Career ==
Davies joined the Education Department in 1920 and was posted to Singapore as the Assistant Master at Raffles Institution (RI), arriving in May. Shortly after, in November, he was posted to Pahang as the acting Inspector of Schools. He was again transferred in February 1922, this time to Taiping, Perak as the acting Headmaster at the Matang Teacher Training College. This was followed by a posting to the Sultan Idris Training College in Tanjong Malim, also in Perak, as Assistant Master. He acted as the school's headmaster. From 1923 to 1924, he acted as the Inspector of Schools for Perak, after which he went on leave before returning to Singapore in June the year after as the Assistant Inspector of Schools there. He began acting as the Inspector in October.

In February 1926, Davies was transferred to Kuala Lumpur to act as the Headmaster of the Victoria Institution, taking over from Richard J. H Sidney, a position he officially assumed in April 1928. He oversaw the school's coming under government management and its relocation to Shaw Road in 1929. He resigned from the post in mid-1929, though he did not officially step down until early 1930. He was then appointed the acting Inspector of Schools for Perak yet again. At the end of the year, he was officially appointed the Inspector of Schools for Penang.

On the retirement of D. A. Bishop in April 1931, Davies returned to Singapore to succeed him as the Headmaster of RI. He was reportedly "very popular" in the position. Historian and future headmaster of RI Eugene Wijeysingha characterised Davies as "modest and unassuming, always right in his judgement, willing to accept responsibility and a true guide to others less capable than himself." Wijeysingha noted that, as a "tireless worker", he "promptly censured" slacking. He was known to be a "strict disciplinarian". On Davies's death, H. J. S. Kanwar of The Malaya Tribune opined that he had "helped the school to improve in all ways" and that he was "one of the best of headmasters."

As principal, he increased the number of school terms in a year to four from three, and "took a great deal of interest" in athletics. He restarted the sports rivalry between the cricket and football teams of RI and St. Joseph's Institution, and worked on a scheme for an inter-school football competition in which each school would send three teams to compete for the Conrad Clarke Trophy, though this had yet to come to fruition on his death. He suggested in an article published posthumously in The Rafflesian that the Chantrey Bust of Sir Stamford Raffles belonged to RI and that he had planned to eventually "retrieve it for the school".

== Personal life and death ==
Davies was married with two children; he had one son and one daughter. He served on the Visiting Committee to the Mental Hospital in Singapore. On 9 January 1932, he was admitted to the Singapore General Hospital as he was suffering from "kidney trouble". He underwent an operation on 18 January, though it was unsuccessful. Davies died on 20 January. His obituary in The Straits Times proclaimed this to be a "great loss" to the Education Department. G. T. Peall acted as Headmaster of RI in his place, and D. W. McLeod was eventually selected as his official successor. The funeral had over a hundred wreaths sent from across Malaya. He was buried at the Bidadari Cemetery.
