= Tan Hock Chuan =

Singaporean magician and teacher (1910–1991)

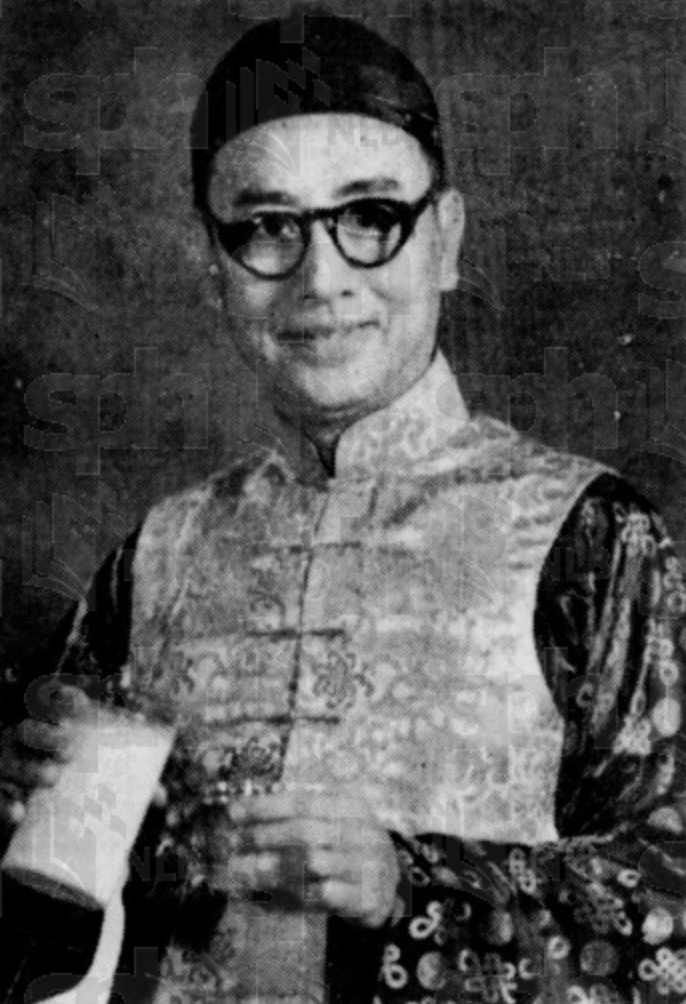
Tan demonstrating a magic trick in 1953.

Bertie Tan Hock Chuan (13 March or 2 April 1910 – 28 September 1991) was a Singaporean amateur stage magician and schoolteacher. A recipient of the Sphinx Gold Medal, he was among the best known magicians in Singapore and a prominent member of the Malayan Magic Circle. According to The Straits Times, he was known as "The Doyen of Singapore Magic".

== Early life and education ==
Tan was born in Singapore on either 13 March or 2 April 1910. (Note: His birthdate has been given as both 13 March and 2 April 1910.) His father was also a magician. When he was nine years old, he came across a roadside magician who "stopped him in his tracks and captured his imagination for life." He began practising magic soon after. On 2 October 1926, Tan performed stage hypnosis and magic at the Telok Ayer Chinese Methodist Church. Of his act, The Malaya Tribune wrote: "Mr. Bertie Tan is a wonder as a hypnotist and a magician, his tricks being exceptionally well done and mystifying all." He received his education at the Anglo-Chinese School, graduating in 1927.

== Career ==
Tan began teaching English and mathematics at the age of 17 after completing his education. He chose to remain a teacher professionally while pursuing magic part-time. He performed "thought-reading" with his "everlasting companion", Yap Tian Beng, at a variety show staged on 9 June 1928 by the Geylang Methodist Church at the YMCA Hall in aid of the Shantung Relief Fund, reportedly garnering "great excitement". The pair again performed "thought-reading" at a show organised by the Health and Strength Leaguers' Union on 30 June and 1 July at the Victoria Theatre. The Malaya Tribune reported that they were "becoming very well known among the Chinese community." In March 1930, Tan was elected the treasurer of the Straits Chinese Epworth League. He was elected the honorary secretary to the Devonshire Badminton Party in February 1932. At the organisation's third general meeting, held in October 1933, he was elected its vice-president alongside Cheong Hock Quee. However, by August of the following year, he had resigned from this position.

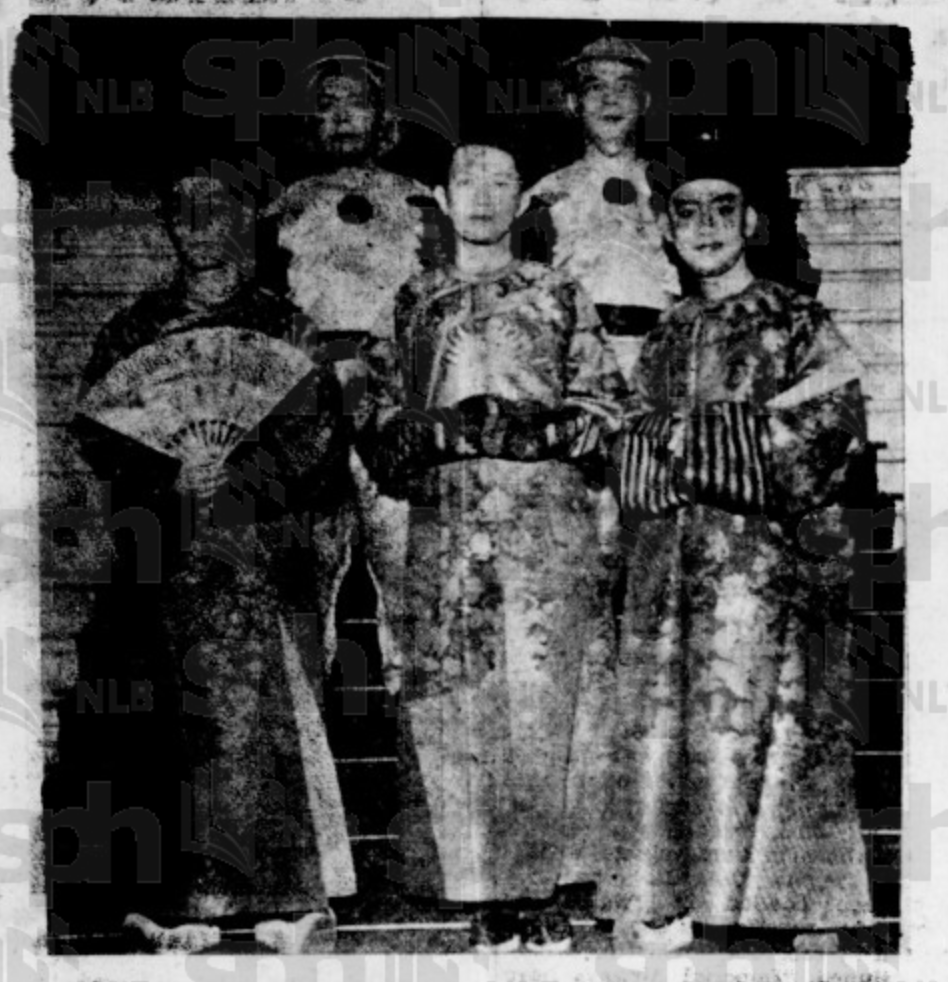
Tan (front row, first from right), along with other performers in Magic, Mirth and Mystery, including A. J. Braga.

Tan was an early member of the Malayan Magic Circle, which was formed in late 1935. He was one only of a "handful" of locals who had joined the organisation, which was primarily made up of "Europeans, particularly Britons." In 1936, the circle staged its first major show, called Magic, Mirth and Mystery, at the Victoria Theatre on 1 and 4 April, with a matinee performance on 2 April. The proceeds of the shows went to the Children's Aid Society. In the show, Tan performed "The Mandarin Dilemma", a "highspot" of the second half, with fellow magician Yeo Soon Kian. All three nights were "crowded". However, Tan was "indisposed and unable to perform" on the third night. In a review of the show's final night, a critic of The Malaya Tribune opined that Tan and Yeo "rank among the best in the circle and gave excellent performances in the two opening shows." In November, Tan was elected to the committee of the Malayan Magical Circle for the ensuing year.

Also in 1936, Tan devised a magic trick involving a "pack of playing cards placed in a tumbler and covered with a bell jar." He claimed to have first envisioned it in a dream. For both this trick, called the "Amazia Wonder Rising Cards", and another trick called the "Cut and Restored Handkerchief", he was awarded the Sphinx Gold Medal, a "top American award for magic" awarded by the monthly magic magazine The Sphinx, in June of the following year.

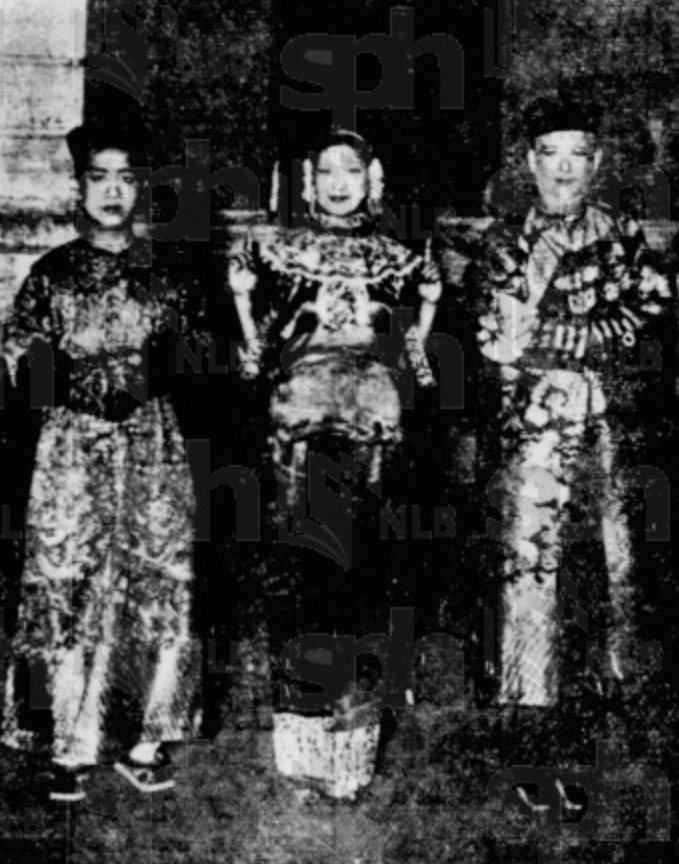
Tan (left) performing in Subtleties.

The Malayan Magic Circle's "grand production" for 1937 was Subtleties. Featuring an orchestra, dancers, a play, a vocal duet, a ventriloquist and a "magical musical play" called The Will of Osiris in addition to magic tricks, the show opened at the Victoria Theatre on 16 June, followed by a matinee performance the following night and another performance on 19 June. Tan opened the second half of the show with an act involving rings. A critic with The Straits Times considered Tan's acts to be among the show's "most outstanding items", along with those of A. J. Braga and Laddie Duckworth. The Malayan Magic Circle's Le Diable opened at the Victoria Theatre on 31 August 1938 with Sultan Ibrahim of Johor in attendance, followed by repeat performances on 2 and 3 September. Of Tan's act in the show, a critic from The Singapore Free Press stated: "Showing extreme brilliance of sleight of hand, Mr. Tan Hock Chuan is excellent in his "Foo Ling Yu" speciality." Tan came in second for the Sphinx Gold Medal in both 1938 and 1939. He also participated in the circle's production Out of the Hat, staged at the Victoria Theatre on 5 and 6 June 1940 in aid of the War Fund. A repeat performance was held on 24 August, with the proceeds going to the War Fund and the Presbyterian Church Fund. He also performed in Lumiere Noire, a show organised by the circle which opened at the Victoria Theatre on 12 October with repeat performances on 18 and 19 October.

Tan performed in the variety show staged by the Urban Co-operative Union Ltd. at the Victoria Theatre in aid of the War Fund on 18 November 1940. The Straits Times called him "another favourite with his polished magic and enchanting patter." He also participated in the Malayan Magic Circle's monthly shows for troops in Singapore at the Victoria Theatre, which began in June 1941. Following the start of the Japanese Occupation of Singapore in 1942, Tan was not interned and instead continued to perform magic at the Victoria Theatre, which was renamed the Showa Gekijo. He performed alongside professional magicians brought in from China and was required to bow in the direction of the Imperial Palace for every show. He claimed to have "just did [his] turn and left." During the occupation, prisoners-of-war were kept at the Malayan Magic Circle's clubhouse at the Karika Mahal. These internees destroyed Tan's magic props for firewood.

Following the end of World War II in 1945, the Malayan Magic Circle's last president, Malcolm David Picton Gilroy, returned to Singapore and the circle was revived. Tan performed in a variety show staged on 6 April at the Victoria Theatre by the St. Francis' Institution in Malacca. The proceeds went to the extension of the institution's boys' orphanage. In April 1949, Tan again came in second for the Sphinx Medal and was awarded the Sphinx International Magicians' Award. In May, his Rough and Smooth Possibilities, an 18-page booklet on card tricks, was published by Arcas Publication. It was positively reviewed by Edward W. Dart in Genii, The Conjurors' Magazine, who wrote: "Tan's book should have a wide demand — that is for those magicians and hobbyists who strive to be original." By then, he had performed in over 500 shows, written a few pieces for magic magazines and was a former member of the International Brotherhood of Magicians. His "repertoire of tricks" then included "Rope Restoration, Linking Rings, Sympathetic Silks, the Ring in the Nest of Boxes, the Dual Prophecy and the Four Aces". In October 1950, Tan entertained members of the Commonwealth Parliamentary Association at the Sea View Hotel. In the same year, a local branch of the International Brotherhood of Magicians, designated Ring 115, was formed. He became the branch's founding secretary.

Tan's "Penetration Most Extraordinary" trick was included in The Sphinx Golden Jubilee Book Of Magic, published by The Sphinx in 1951, as one of "the really great contributions to magic during the past 50 years." By then, the trick had reportedly been performed internationally. By then, he was teaching at the Monk's Hill School. In April of that year, he performed in the Show Business variety show staged by Vernon Martinus at the Victoria Theatre. In a review of the event, Toni Walsh of The Straits Times noted that he was then the head of the Malayan Magic Circle and opined that "not only is he very clever, he is most amusing." However, in April 1952, Gilroy was killed by a lightning strike. According to Tan, after this, the Malayan Magic Circle "really died off". Though there were a few revival attempts, only around a dozen were interested and meetings from then on were attended by only five or six members. By December 1953, he claimed to have given over 1,000 shows. The latest trick he had devised was "Multum in Parvo". However, he had reportedly "never set foot outside the country." He was then also a teacher at the Bartley Secondary School and a "lifelong member" of the Straits Chinese British Association. In March 1958, Tan was named the magazine M-U-M's "Magician of the Month". In its issue dedicated to him, the magazine noted that "several of his effects have been marketed, with and without his permission", and that several of his tricks, such as "Multum in Parvo", had been "reprinted with credit assigned to others." In May of the following year, he was made a member of The Magic Circle in London.

In April 1969, Tan retired as a schoolteacher, after which he went on a round-the-world trip, which was his first trip out of Singapore. He attended the International Brotherhood of Magicians Annual Convention, held in the United States from 3 to 5 July. He became a prominent member of the Singapore Association of Magicians, which was formed in 1973. He claimed to attend all of the association's monthly meetings and was nicknamed the "Walking Encyclopaedia of Magic." In July 1974, Tan was re-elected the president of the Singaporean Assembly No. 90 of the Society of American Magicians. In July 1975, he was elected the assembly's vice-president, with Lim Hap Hin being elected president instead. He was again elected to this position in July 1982. In the same year, Alan John of The Straits Times reported that Tan was called "The Doyen of Singapore Magic" and claimed that he was the "one man to talk to" for learning about magic in Singapore.

== Personal life and death ==
According to magician and museum director Wittus Witt, Tan married Khoo Chye Neo on 1 June 1931. Together, they had two sons. He lived on Orchard Road before moving to the Serangoon Gardens neighbourhood by 1982. By then, he had amassed a collection of over 3,000 books on magic, some of which had belonged to his father. However, as neither of his sons were interested in magic, he had begun selling some of his books. By March 1946, he had been made the honorary secretary of the Anglo-Chinese School Old Boys' Association.

Tan died on 28 September 1991. His body was cremated at the Mount Vernon Columbarium complex crematorium.
