= Raffles' Bust =

Busts of Stamford Raffles by Francis Chantrey

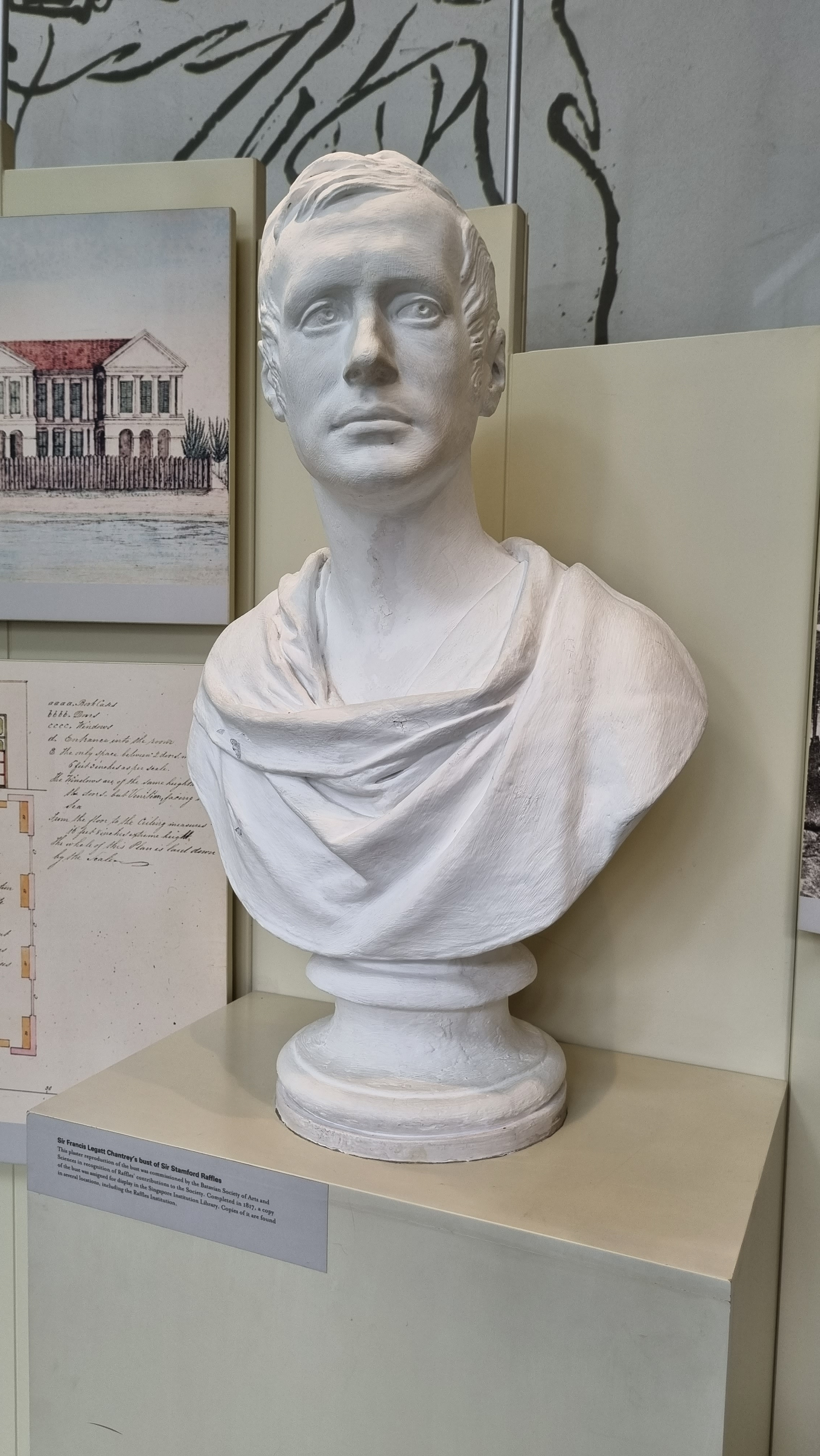
- A replica of Chantrey's bust displayed in the National Library, Singapore
- Artist: Francis Leggatt Chantrey
- Year: 1817
- Medium: Marble
- Subject: Stamford Raffles
- Dimensions: 152.2 cm × 74 cm × 58.4 cm (59.9 in × 29 in × 23.0 in)
- Condition: Believed to have been destroyed in the sinking of the Fame (original)
- Location: Singapore
- Accession: 2009-01379

Raffles' Bust refers to multiple busts of British Colonial Official Stamford Raffles, though mainly a marble bust created by Francis Leggatt Chantrey in 1817 that honours Raffles' contributions to the Batavian Society of Arts and Science and is believed to have been destroyed by the sinking of the Fame in 1818. At least two replicas of the bust using different materials were created after sinking using a plaster copy Chantrey had, most prominently one in the Zoological Society of London and Raffles' institution.

The original bust was proposed by members of the Batavian Society of Arts and Science as a token of gratitude for Stamford Raffles. It was later commissioned by Raffles to sculptor Francis Leggatt Chantrey on 17 October 1817 after Raffles was recently knighted. When Raffles returned to Sumatra, he gave the bust to his wife for safekeeping. His wife brought it on the Fame, which sunk on February 2, 1824.

== The Original Bust ==
The idea for a bust of Raffles was proposed by members of the Batavian Society of Arts and Science as a token of gratitude to Stamford Raffles, then Lieutenant-Governor of Java, for helping to revive the learning society in 1812 after he announced his resignation from the group in 1816. Originally, the bust was meant for their Patron, the Earl of Minto who unexpectedly died on his way back to England. On 17 October 1817, Raffles commissioned sculptor Francis Leggatt Chantrey to create a marble bust of “an image of the recently knighted Raffles resplendent in youth and vigour” with a payment of £126 in cash.

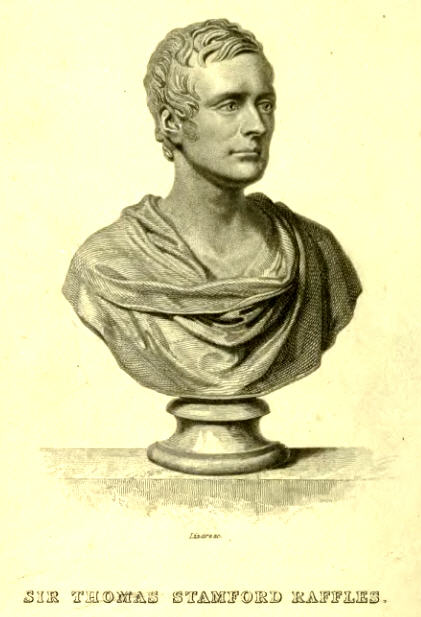
A drawing of the original bust from The Natural History of Game-birds

However, when Raffles returned to Sumatra in 1818, he gave the bust to his wife, Sophia Raffles for safekeeping due to him "not being truly welcomed by the Dutch Colonial Authorities". She kept the bust and brought it for a trip to London on the ship the Fame, where it is widely believed that the bust was destroyed by the ship's sinking on February 2, 1824, which was caused by a fire.

== Bust in the Zoological Society of London ==
Following the sinking of the Fame, at least two busts of Stamford Raffles were commissioned through a plaster copy that Francis Leggatt Chantrey had kept. One of those commissions was for a marble bust of Raffles created by sculptor E. Roscoe Mullins for the Zoological Society of London (ZSL) presented by Reverend William Charles Flint with a commemorative plaque in 1877. The bust was located in the recess above the clock and the central doorway to the old Lion House in the ZSL London Zoo before the plaque was moved to the ZSL Library whilst a reproduction of the bust was placed in the entrance lobby of ZSL's Regent's Park offices. This copy was mistakenly thought to be the 'original' and was used as a model for a 1929 bronze model for the 150th anniversary of the Batavia Society of Arts and Science.

== Bust in Raffles Institution ==
Another one of the commissions was a copy of Chantrey bust by Sophia Raffles which was presented to the Singapore Institution (now Raffles Institution) in the 1837. When the Raffles Museum and Library building was completed, it was decided on January 1, 1836, that the bust was to be placed in a conspicuous area in the building with inscriptions in English, Latin, Chinese and Malay (although according to historian Charles Buton Buckley, such inscriptions were never made). However, it was deemed "too valuable" for public display by succeeding headmasters and was moved to their homes for safety, only being revealed during annual speeches and award ceremonies. It was removed to the Singapore Library in 1846 before being moved to Raffles museum (the National Museum of Singapore) in 1849 and subsequently moved back to RI where it remained there until October 1906 when then headmaster R. W. Hullet presented the bust to the Singapore Municipality office upon his retirement. The bust was in the office until the 1940's where it was believed to have been lost during World War 2. (Note: As a matter of fact, there are no records stating that the bust was one of the items in the office designated for safekeeping in 1942.) Unbeknowingly, in 1972, it was found to have been mouldering away in the cellar of the Singapore Trade Office in London since 1957. It was believed to be residing in the Singapore High Commission Office in London before being returned to RI in 1994 by one of Raffles' distant nephews, which is now sitting inside the boardroom.

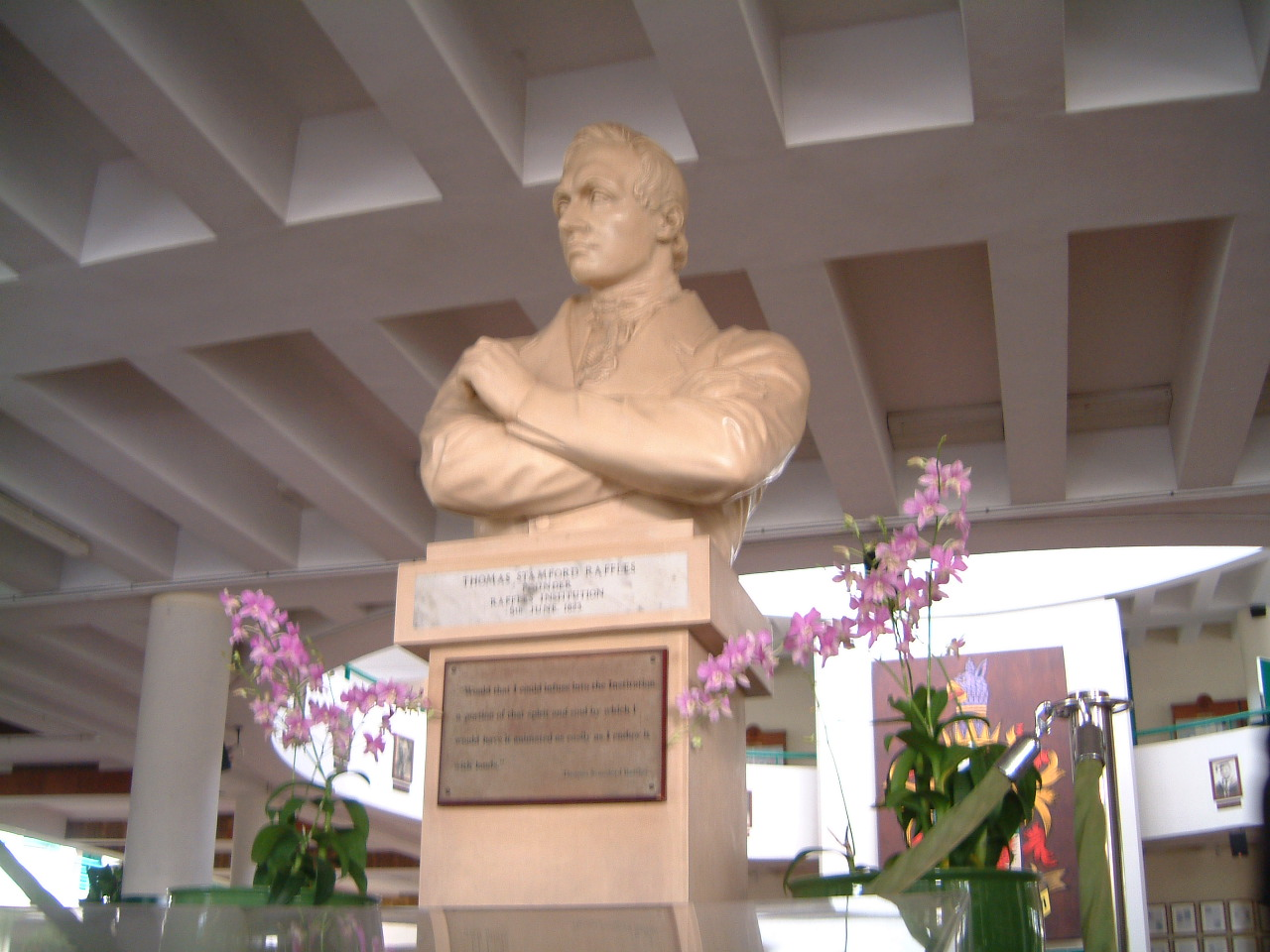
One of the Raffles Institution bust

In 1972, headmaster Philip Liau commissioned Malaysian stone company Victor and Mendez to make a polymarble copy of the original bust in its absence. It was placed in front of the Year 1-4 General Office on the upper balcony facing the parade square of the Grange Road Campus with the quote “Would that I could infuse into the institution a portion of that spirit and soul by which I would have it animated as easily as I endow it with lands”. Additionally, according to an RI alumni, there was another bust in the Grange Road Campus stored in a must room underneath a stage. In 1982, to commemorate the founding of Raffles Junior College, the graduating class gifted the school a replica of the polymarble bust. Both busts were relocated to the grand entrance and the Yusof Ishak Block in the new Bishan Campus in 1990 and 2005 for RI and RJC, respectively.
