= D. W. McLeod =

British educator and civil servant (died 1946)

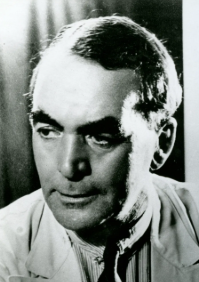
McLeod as the headmaster of Raffles Institution.

David William McLeod (died 10 December 1946) was a British educator and civil servant who served as the headmaster of the Penang Free School from 1929 to 1932 and of Raffles Institution in Singapore from 1932 to 1940. He was known to emphasise academic performance as principal and his appointment to the lattermost school is considered to have brought an end to its "Golden Age of Athleticism".

== Early life and education ==
McLeod graduated from the University of Aberdeen with a Master of Arts degree in 1908.

== Career ==
After graduating from university, McLeod joined the Malayan Education Service. He served in the Royal Air Force as a second lieutenant in World War I, and was reported on 30 May as having been wounded in action. After the war, he was posted to Seychelles as the principal of King's College, where he remained for four years.

McLeod arrived in Taiping, Perak in early 1920 to serve as the assistant master at the King Edward VII School. In May, headmaster Roger Francis Stainer went on leave and McLeod acted as headmaster in his place. In November 1921, he left for Singapore to act as Inspector of Schools for Singapore and Malacca. He also served as headmaster of Outram Road School in this period. By January 1923, he had returned to the King Edward VII School as headmaster. Under his leadership, the school performed well academically and in sports, scouting and cadet training. In a promotion, McLeod was transferred to the prestigious Penang Free School in Penang as its headmaster in October 1929. His successor at the King Edward VII School was David R. Swaine, who was also his predecessor at Penang.

=== Singapore ===
In February 1932, McLeod returned to RI as headmaster, succeeding G. C. Davies, who had died shortly after being appointed to the position. He had been on leave from the Penang Free School on his appointment, and the acting principal there, M. R. Holgate, officially succeeded him in that position. According to historian Eugene Wijeysingha, who would serve as the institution's principal several decades later, McLeod had a reputation for being efficient yet strict and "absolutely meticulous", so much so that he "proved to be the terror of the school." Wijeysingha noted that McLeod was a "typical Victorian school master who hounded both the teacher and the pupil." He viewed academic and scholastic achievements as a far more important factor than athletic achievements or "administrative ability" in a student's success, though he also believed that a "strong character" was the most important factor. McLeod himself was reported to have been able to "teach any subject", though he preferred science and mathematics.

As headmaster, McLeod devoted far less attention to sports and games than his predecessors, though he still did so at a house level. He also attended school games, though he seldom partook in them. Peter Horton noted that, with his appointment, the "Golden Age of Athleticism" at RI had come to a close, and that McLeod represented the then "waning" interest in athletics in England, thus bringing the school "even more in line" with Winchester College. Despite this, interest in sports among the students continued to grow throughout his tenure. Wijeysingha argued that it was "fortunate" that McLeod's predecessors had given attention to the "various aspects of an overall educational programme which included a variety of sports."

McLeod initiated the practice of attendance taking for teachers at the start of the day. He was also the first to seriously consider relocating the school, "[stressing] the need for more accommodation", and pushed for the school's resiting to a larger premises in Katong, though his plans ultimately did not come to fruition and the school would remain at its Bras Basah Road premises for several decades more. He was also a heavy advocate for the improvement of post-school education for white collar workers. Wijeysingha felt that the school possibly "[owed] most to McLeod" after Richmond William Hullett. He later elaborated that McLeod's prioritisation of academic performance was evidenced by the number of students from his tenure as principal who "rose to prominent positions in the academic world". The school produced several Queen's Scholars in this period. Students then included future Prime Minister Lee Kuan Yew, who was caned by McLeod for tardiness and who remembered the latter as a "fair but strict disciplinarian".

Shortly after assuming the post of principal at RI in 1932, McLeod was also appointed the chair of the Working Committee of the Careers Committee of the local Department of Education. In August 1933, McLeod was appointed a vice-president of the Singapore Teachers' Association. He contributed an essay to the first issue of the Singapore Teachers' Association's official organ, The Singapore Schoolmaster, published in December 1934. The Straits Times considered the essay a "brave, honest and clearsighted statement by a man who plainly feels that in his own professional sphere the times are out of joint, that the results which he and his colleagues are getting are not nearly as good as they could be, and that dubious or false remedies for those shortcomings are being put forward." On returning essays on the future of the world to Lee's class, McLeod reportedly stated: "out of this class one of you will be Prime Minister of this country." It was generally held that he was referring to Lee.

In September 1932, he was appointed to the Visiting Committee to the Mental Hospital. In August 1933, he was appointed a vice-president of the Singapore Malay Gurus Co-operative Society. McLeod was put in charge of designing and organising an experimental scheme of the Department of Education, the Extension Lecture Course, which began in 1935. The year after, he was appointed to a committee of educators headed by Inspector of Schools Harold Cheeseman which investigated and eventually published a report condemning the process by which Queen's Scholarships were awarded. In March 1937, McLeod was elected the president of the Singapore Teachers' Association.

It was announced in April 1940 that McLeod was to be retiring from the education service. He was to step down as principal in June, after which he would be succeeded by Holgate. He then went on leave before his official retirement. He went to visit his daughter in South Africa before leaving for England, where he planned to "take up war work." On his resignation, he opined that the curricula of schools across the British Empire then were "too highly theoretical with no practical basis."

== Personal life and death ==
McLeod married Indeborg Berth, the daughter of L. Berth of Copenhagen, in March 1922. He was involved with the Rotary Club in Singapore.

McLeod died at the City Hospital in Aberdeen on 10 December 1946. He was then noted as being "of Singapore and Invergordon." He was cremated at the Aberdeen Crematorium.
