= 1956 in Singapore =

- Decades: 1930s; 1940s; 1950s; 1960s; 1970s
- See also: Other events of 1956; Timeline of Singaporean history

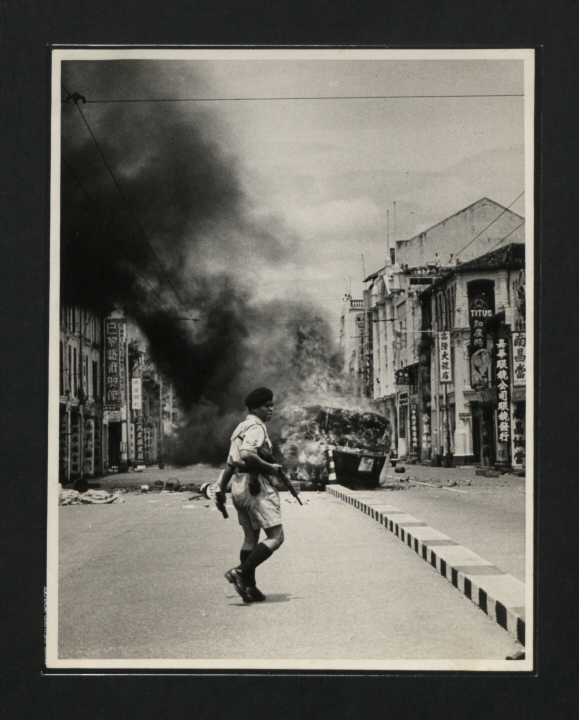
Communist front inspired riots, Singapore, October 1956

The following lists events that happened during 1956 in Colony of Singapore.

== Incumbents ==
- Governor: Sir Robert Brown Black
- Chief Minister:
  - David Marshall (until June 7)
  - Lim Yew Hock (from June 8)
- Chief Secretary: Sir William Goode

== Events ==
=== March ===
- 15 March — Nanyang University is officiated with a flag-raising ceremony, with classes beginning on 30 March.

=== April ===
- 23 April — The first Merdeka talks were held, which failed on 23 May after failing to compromise on internal security arrangements. As a result, David Marshall resigned.

=== June ===
- 8 June — Lim Yew Hock became the second Chief Minister of Singapore.

=== August ===
- 17 August — The Nicoll Highway and Merdeka Bridge are officially opened.

=== October ===
- 10 October — Protests by students occurred after several organisations were dissolved over communist links. The protests continued over two weeks, culminating into riots that occurred on 25 October.

== Births ==
- 12 January — Matthias Yao, former MP for Marine Parade GRC (MacPherson)
- 15 April — Ho Geok Choo, former MP for West Coast GRC (Boon Lay)
- 23 July — Iskandar Ismail, musician and winner of 2008 Cultural Medallion in Music (d. 2014).
- 3 September — Tan Yong Kwang, judge of the Supreme Court.
- 5 September — Low Thia Khiang, 8th Secretary-General of the Workers' Party and 8th Leader of the Opposition
- 12 September — Walter Woon, 5th Attorney-General of Singapore
- 1 October — Chan Soo Sen, Former MP for Joo Chiat SMC

== Deaths ==
- 21 July — Lim Chong Pang, prominent businessman and long-time member of the Singapore Rural Board (b. 1904).
- 25 July — Ronald John Farrer, Former President of the Singapore Municipal Commission (b. 1872).
- 13 September — Chia Hock Chwee, fisherman and father-in-law of Lim Chong Pang (b. 1895).
- 29 September — Kee Yew Hock, water polo player and the first man to introduce neon signs to Singapore (b. 1905).
- 24 October — Henry Nicholas Ridley, 1st Director of Singapore Botanic Gardens (b. 1855).
- 29 November — Father Stephen Lee, Parish Priest of Church of St. Teresa (b. 1896).

== See also ==
- List of years in Singapore
