= 1954 in Singapore =

- Decades: 1930s; 1940s; 1950s; 1960s; 1970s
- See also: Other events of 1954; Timeline of Singaporean history

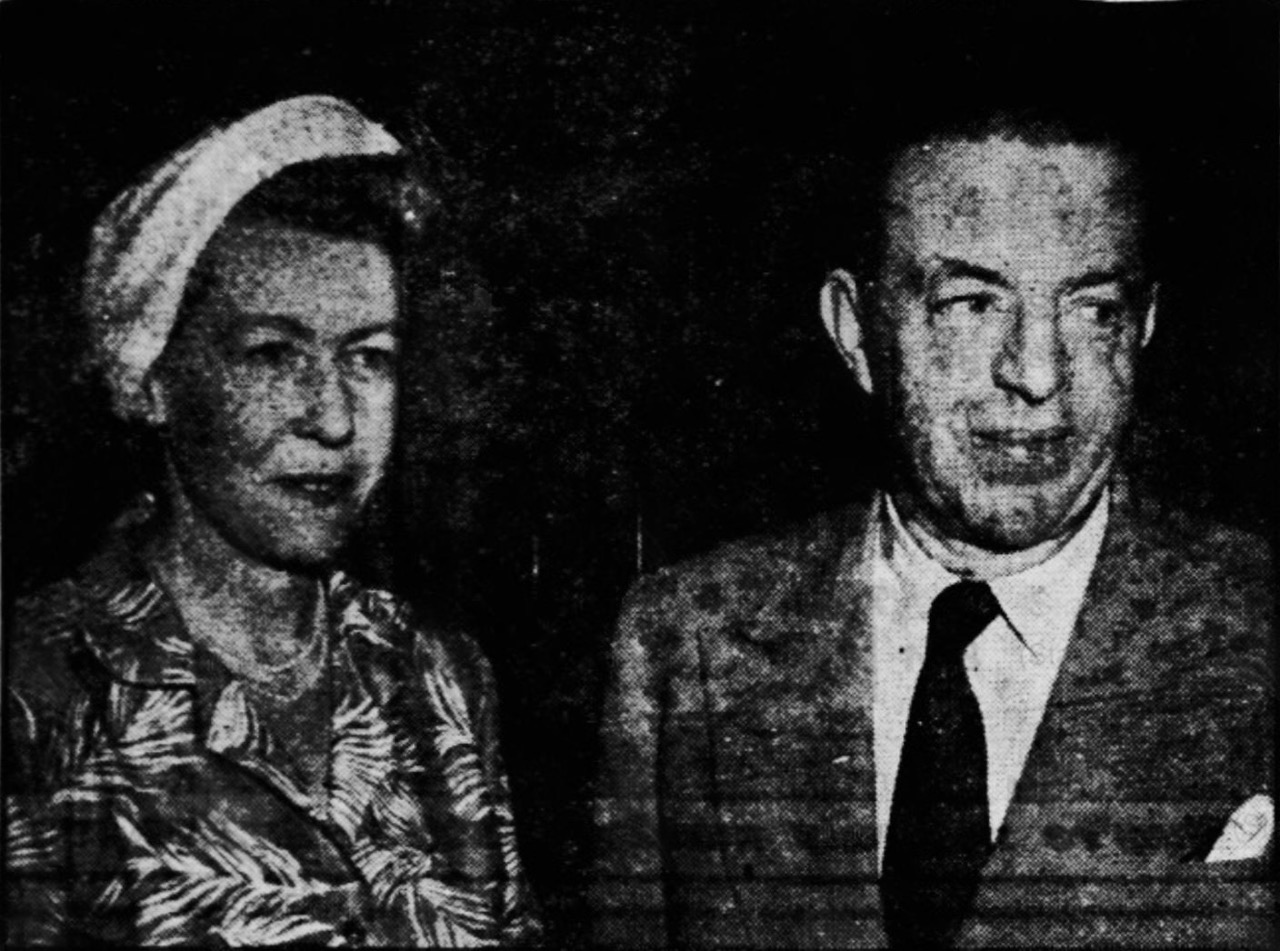
The Governor-designate for North Borneo. Mr. R. E. Turnbull, C.M.G., and Mrs. Turnbull photographed on their arrival in Singapore on March 1, 1954 on board the Carthage.

The following lists events that happened during 1954 in Colony of Singapore.

== Incumbents ==
- Governor: Sir John Fearns Nicoll
- Colonial Secretary: Sir Wiiliam Goode

== Events ==
=== February ===
- 6 February – 300 Straits Times printing employees when on strike, resulting in The Sunday Times not being published the following day.
- 22 February – Rendel Commission's recommendations were unveiled to the public. It proposed changes to the constitution, which took effect on 8 February 1955.

=== May ===
- 13 May – The National Service riots took place in Singapore after a peaceful demonstration turned violent.

=== August ===
- 21 August – The Singapore Labour Front (LF) was founded.

=== October ===
- 27 October – Singapore Polytechnic was founded as the first polytechnic in Singapore.

=== November ===
- 21 November – The People's Action Party (PAP) was founded.

== Births ==
- 6 January – Ong Keng Yong, diplomat.
- 12 February – Tan Jee Say, politician and former public servant.
- 9 April – Lim Hng Kiang, former politician.
- 24 April – Belinda Ang, judge of the Court of Appeal.
- 9 May – Ho Peng Kee, legal academic and former politician.
- 10 July – Lim Kay Tong, film, television and stage actor.
- 13 July – Lim Swee Say, former politician.
- 23 August – Halimah Yacob, 8th President of Singapore.
- 13 September – George Yeo, former politician.
- 22 September – Marcus Chin, actor.
- 29 November – Koo Tsai Kee, associate professor and former politician.
- 27 December – Teo Chee Hean, Senior Minister of Singapore.

== Deaths ==
- 24 February – Tan Heng Fu, one of the three Great Singaporean Chinese calligraphers (b. 1874).
- 3 June – Wee Swee Teow, barrister and former President of Straits Chinese British Association (b. 1880).
- 4 September – Aw Boon Haw, entrepreneur and philanthropist best known as founder of Tiger Balm (b. 1882).
- 28 September – George Parbury, pre-war municipal commissioner (b. 1876).
- 9 December – Charles Paglar, Eurasian community leader and Progressive Party Legislative Councillor for Changi Constituency (b. 1894).

== See also ==
- List of years in Singapore
