= 1955 in Singapore =

- Decades: 1930s; 1940s; 1950s; 1960s; 1970s
- See also: Other events of 1955; Timeline of Singaporean history

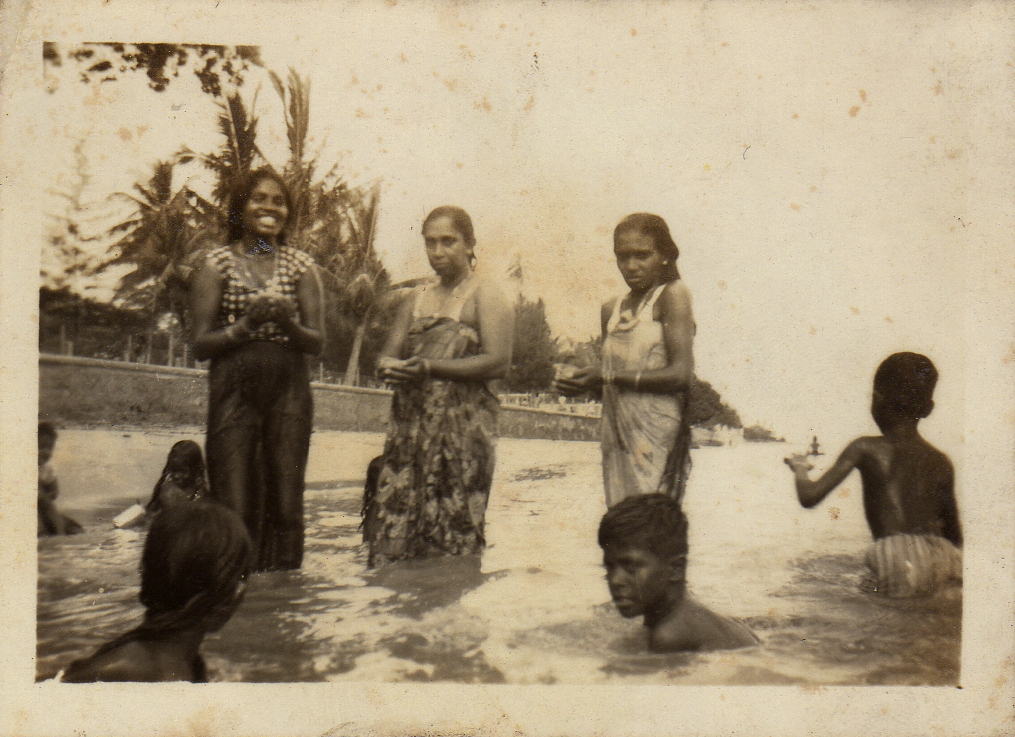
A thali pirikkal ceremony at Katong Beach, Marine Parade, in Singapore, 1955.

The following lists events that happened during 1955 in Colony of Singapore.

== Incumbents ==
- Governor:
  - until 2 June: Sir John Fearns Nicoll
  - 2 June-30 June: Sir William Goode (as Officer Administrating the Government)
  - starting 30 June: Sir Robert Brown Black
- Chief Minister: David Marshall
- Colonial Secretary: Sir William Goode (till January 1955)
- Chief Secretary: Sir William Goode (starting February 1955)

== Events ==
=== January ===
- 1 January – The Singapore Telephone Board (STB) and Telephone Department (TD) are formed after the British Colonial Government terminated Oriental Telephone and Electric Company's licence, thus acquiring its assets. The STB takes control of domestic telephone lines, with the TD controlling trunk and international services.

=== April ===
- 2 April – Singapore held its first Legislative Assembly elections. The Singapore Labour Front (LF) won the elections, the first where a majority of seats were contested.
- 6 April – David Marshall became the first Chief Minister of Singapore.
- 7 April – The Ministry of Education is established.
- 23 April – The Hock Lee bus workers' strike began.
- 30 April – Singapore Harbour Board Staff Association Strike.

=== May ===
- 12 May – The Hock Lee strikes escalated into a riot, resulting in 4 fatalities.

=== June ===
- 2 June – Sir John Nicoll retires and William Goode becomes acting Governor of Singapore.
- 30 June – Sir Robert Black becomes the 3rd Governor of Singapore.

=== July ===
- 1 July – The Central Provident Fund is formed as a savings scheme to support workers during retirement.
- 6 July – The Singapore Harbour Board Staff Association Strike ends.

=== August ===
- 20 August – The Paya Lebar Airport is officially opened, replacing the Kallang Airport which opened on 12 June 1937.

=== September ===
- 8 September – The Van Kleef Aquarium is opened.
- 22 September – To deal with crimes, the Criminal Law (Temporary Provisions) Act is passed, allowing for detentions.

=== October ===
- 7 October – The Singapore Chinese Middle School Students Union is formed.

=== November ===
- 23 November – The administration of Cocos (Keeling) Islands is transferred to Australia after several delays.

=== December ===
- 10 December – The Asia Insurance Building is opened, then Southeast Asia's tallest building.
- 28-29 December – David Marshall represented the government of the Crown Colony of Singapore in the Baling Talks.

== Births ==
- 7 January – Lee Wei Ling, neurologist (d. 2024).
- 24 January – Ang Yong Guan, politician and psychiatrist.
- 30 January – Zhu Houren, actor and filmmaker.
- 11 July – Balaji Sadasivan, former Senior Minister of State for Foreign Affairs (d. 2010).
- 10 August – Bey Soo Khiang, business executive and former RSAF lieutenant general.
- 3 October – Yaacob Ibrahim, former politician.
- 27 October – Michael Chiang, playwright.
- 9 December – Rahimah Rahim, singer.

=== Dates unknown ===
- Sim Wong Hoo, founder of Creative Technology (d. 2023).

== Deaths ==
- 12 April – Teo Kim Eng, businessman (b. 1893).
- 15 May – Victor J. Mendis, lawyer and founding member of Labour Front (b. 1894).
- 4 June – S. S. Manyam, President of Labour Party and former City Councillor for North Constituency (b. 1913).
- 28 August – Quek Shin, Hainanese community leader and former Director of the Overseas Union Bank (b. 1886).
- 9 October – Tham Soong, concubine of famous dentist Cheong Chin Nam (b. 1880).
- 14 October – A. C. Suppiah, social reformer, pharmacist, linguist, writer, entrepreneur and philanthropist (b. 1880).

== See also ==
- 1955 Singaporean general election
- List of years in Singapore
