= 1840 in the United Kingdom =

Events from the year 1840 in the United Kingdom.

== Incumbents ==
- Monarch – Victoria
- Prime Minister – William Lamb, 2nd Viscount Melbourne (Whig)
- Foreign Secretary – Henry John Temple, 3rd Viscount Palmerston
- Home Secretary – Constantine Phipps, 1st Marquess of Normanby

== Events ==
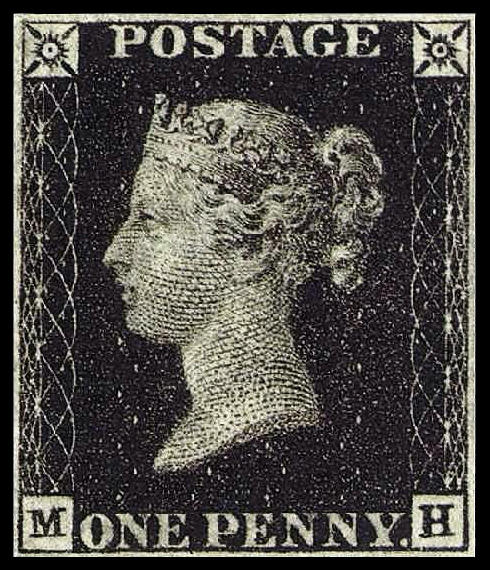
Penny Black

- 1 January – Trial of Welsh Chartists John Frost, Zephaniah Williams and William Jones for their part in the Newport Rising of 1839 opens at Monmouth before Chief Justice Tindal; this is the first trial where proceedings are recorded in shorthand.
- 10 January – Uniform Penny Post introduced, replacing the Uniform Fourpenny Post of 1839.
- 12 January – Chartist rising in Sheffield aborted.
- 14 January – Chartist rising in the East End of London largely suppressed by police.
- 16 January – Frost, Williams and Jones are all found guilty of high treason for their part in the Chartist riots, and are sentenced to death; the last time the sentence of hanging, drawing and quartering is passed in the UK, although following a nationwide petitioning campaign and direct lobbying of the Home Secretary by the Lord Chief Justice, it is commuted to transportation for life (Frost is eventually pardoned).
- 22 January – British colonists reach New Zealand. Official founding date of Wellington.
- 26 January – Chartist rising in Bradford fails to spread.
- 6 February – Treaty of Waitangi, a document granting British sovereignty in New Zealand, is signed.
- 10 February – Queen Victoria marries her cousin Prince Albert of Saxe-Coburg and Gotha in the Royal Chapel at St James's Palace.
- 15 April – King's College Hospital opens in Portugal Street, London.
- 27 April – The foundation stone of the new Palace of Westminster is laid as its reconstruction following the Burning of Parliament in 1834 begins (completed in 1860).
- 1 May – Issue of the Penny Black, the world's first postage stamp, together with Mulready stationery. The stamp becomes valid for prepayment of postage from 6 May.
- 5 May - Thomas Carlyle gives the first lecture in the series On Heroes, Hero Worship and the Heroic in History.
- 11 May – Chartist leader Feargus O'Connor is sentenced to imprisonment in York Castle for seditious libel over speeches published in The Northern Star.
- 20 May – York Minster's nave roof is destroyed in an accidental fire.
- 6 June – The first group of British emigrants from the Church of Jesus Christ of Latter-day Saints set sail from Liverpool bound for Nauvoo, Illinois.
- 10 June – Edward Oxford fires a pistol at Queen Victoria in Hyde Park, London.
- 12–23 June – The World Anti-Slavery Convention is organised by the British and Foreign Anti-Slavery Society at Exeter Hall in London.
- July
  - Fresh water is piped to Buxton Market Place by the 6th Duke of Devonshire, beginning the Buxton well dressing festival.
  - Last known great auk in the British Isles caught and later killed on the islet of Stac an Armin, St Kilda, Scotland.
- 4 July – The Cunard Line's 700-ton wooden paddle steamer RMS Britannia departs from Liverpool bound for Halifax, Nova Scotia, on the first steam transatlantic passenger mail service.
- 15 July – Austria, Britain, Prussia, and Russia sign the London Treaty with the Sublime Porte, ruler of the Ottoman Empire.
- 23 July
  - The Province of Canada is created by the Act of Union.
  - Vaccination Act 1840 provides for free vaccination for the poor and prohibits variolation.
- 7 August – Chimney Sweepers and Chimneys Regulation Act 1840 prohibits the employment of children under the age of 21 as chimney sweeps.
- 10 September – Ottoman and British troops bombard Beirut and land troops on the coast to pressure Egyptian Muhammad Ali to retreat from the country.
- 16 September – Joseph Strutt hands over the deeds and papers concerning the Derby Arboretum, which is to become England's first public park.
- 30 September – Foundation of Nelson's Column laid in London, Trafalgar Square being laid out (as a hectare) and paved during the year.
- 11 October – Maronite leader Bashir Shihab II surrenders to the Ottomans (in alliance with the British) and on 14 October goes into exile, initially in Malta.
- 10 November – The boiler of an experimental steam locomotive named Surprise explodes near Bromsgrove station in Worcestershire, killing the driver, Thomas Scaife and fireman, Joseph Rutherford.
- 8 December – David Livingstone leaves for Africa.
- 21 December – Stockport Viaduct is completed. It is one of the largest brick structures in Europe.

=== Undated ===
- The Royal Society for the Prevention of Cruelty to Animals gains its Royal status.
- Smallpox epidemic of 1837–40 ends, leaving more than 41,600 dead.

=== Ongoing ===
- First Opium War (1839–1842)
- First Anglo-Afghan War (1839–1842)

== Publications ==
- W. Harrison Ainsworth's historical novels Guy Fawkes and The Tower of London (both serialised).
- Charles Dickens' novel The Old Curiosity Shop (serialised).
- "Thomas Ingoldsby"'s The Ingoldsby Legends (first collected in book form).
- Agnes Strickland's Lives of the Queens of England begins publication.
- William Makepeace Thackeray's novel Catherine.
- William Whewell's book The Philosophy of the Inductive Sciences, founded upon their history, in which he introduces the words "Physicist" and (for the second time) "Scientist".

== Births ==
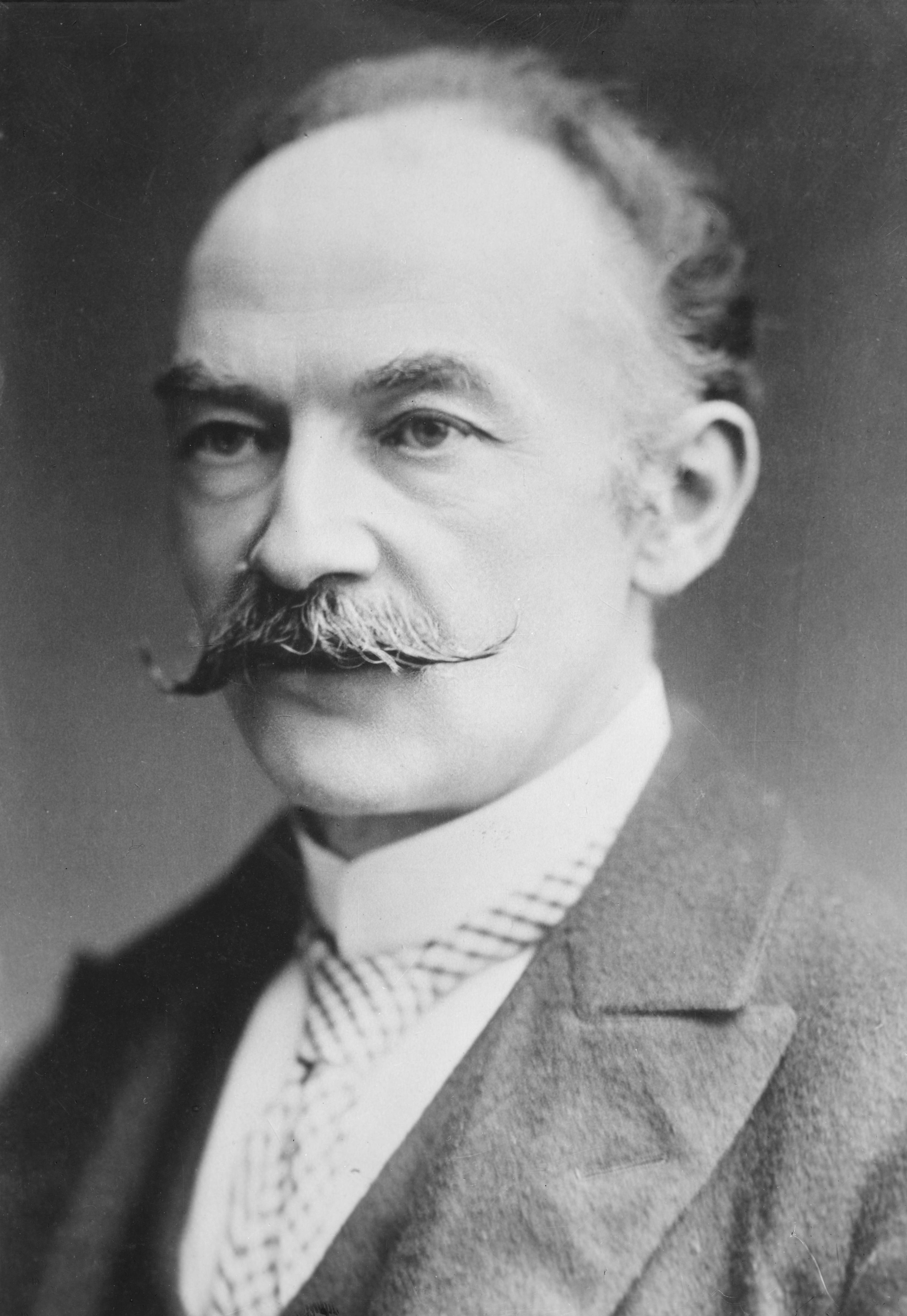
Thomas Hardy

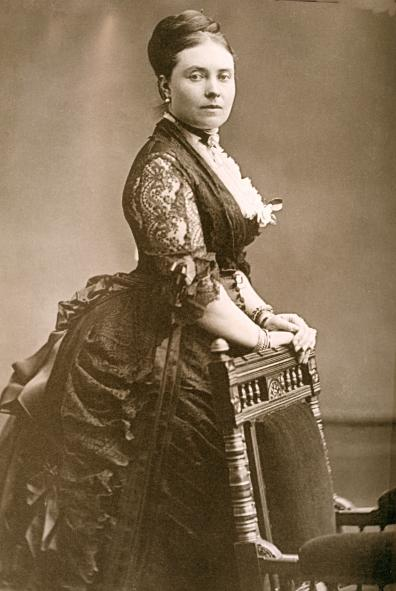
Victoria, Princess Royal

- 1 January – Dugald Drummond, Scottish-born railway locomotive engineer (died 1912)
- 18 January – Henry Austin Dobson, poet and essayist (died 1921)
- 26 January – John Clayton Adams, landscape painter (died 1906)
- 5 February – John Boyd Dunlop, Scottish-born inventor (died 1921)
- 29 February – John Philip Holland, Irish-born submarine designer (died 1914)
- 30 March – Charles Booth, shipowner and social reformer (died 1916)
- 31 March – Benjamin Baker, civil engineer (died 1907)
- 27 April – Edward Whymper, mountaineer (died 1911)
- 2 June – Thomas Hardy, novelist and poet (died 1928)
- 20 June – George Selwyn Marryat, fly fisherman (died 1896)
- 21 June – Edward Stanley Gibbons, philatelic stamp dealer (died 1913)
- 9 October – Simeon Solomon, painter (died 1905)
- 21 November – Victoria, Princess Royal (died 1901)
- 29 November – Rhoda Broughton, fiction writer (died 1920)

== Deaths ==
- 6 January – Frances Burney, novelist (born 1752)
- 18 February – Sir Jeffry Wyattville, architect and garden designer (born 1766)
- 30 March – Beau Brummell, arbiter of fashion (born 1778)
- 7 April – William Heath, caricaturist (born 1794)
- 15 April – Thomas Drummond, army officer, civil engineer and public official (born 1797)
- 1 May – Joseph Williamson, philanthropist and builder of Williamson's tunnels (born 1769)
- 26 May – Sidney Smith, admiral (born 1764)
- 28 July – John Lambton, 1st Earl of Durham (born 1792)
- 22 September
  - Princess Augusta Sophia of the United Kingdom (born 1768)
  - Anne Lister, landowner, diarist, mountaineer and traveller, "the first modern lesbian" (born 1791)
