= Kua Bak Lim =

Singaporean historian

Kua Bak Lim (born 1948) is a Singaporean historian.

== Career ==
Kua was the host of the 13-part Mandarin radio programme Night Chats on Silat, which retold Singapore's history in tales. The programme aired every Friday evening, beginning on 10 July 1987. He was the leader of research for Who's Who in the Chinese Community of Singapore, a book which listed 1,175 prominent figures in the Chinese community of Singapore. It was launched on 25 November 1995.

He was the chief editor of A General History of the Chinese in Singapore, which was launched by Prime Minister Lee Hsien Loong on 9 November 2015. On 24 May 2019, he received the Singapore Chinese Cultural Contribution Award from then Minister of Culture, Community and Youth Grace Fu. By then, he had also been appointed the head of the research committee of the Singapore Federation of Chinese Clan Associations. He was the editor-in-chief of An Illustrious Heritage: The History of Tan Tock Seng and Family.

== Personal life ==
Kua is married.
