= Mariner (1807 ship) =

British sailing ship

History

United Kingdom
- Name: Mariner
- Owner: Jos. Barker, Wy., and Chapman
- Builder: Fishburn and Brodrick
- Launched: 21 July 1807
- Fate: Still listed in 1856

General characteristics
- Tons burthen: 446, or 44689/94, or 449 (bm)
- Length: 113 ft 6 in (34.6 m)
- Beam: 30 ft 3 1/2 in (9.2 m)
- Propulsion: Sail
- Armament: 8 × 6-pounder guns

Mariner was a British sailing ship, launched at Whitby in 1807, and registered in London. Her notability comes from her having made three voyages transporting convicts to New South Wales between 1816 and 1827. She continued trading until 1857.

== Career ==
Mariner first appears in Lloyd's Register for 1808 with C. Dinning, master, and trade: London transport. Except for a change in master to Brown, the entry is unchanged in 1815.

=== Convict transport ===
==== First convict voyage (1816) ====
Mariner, John Herbert, master, left England in June 1816 with destination Port Jackson. She arrived there 11 October. She had embarked 145 male convicts and suffered no deaths en route. She left Port Jackson on 28 November with destination Bengal. In 1818 Herbert and Mariner were sailing between London and India. She had, by this time, disarmed.

==== 1824 ====
On 2 February 1824 the East Indiaman Fame caught fire about 50 miles south-west of Bencoolen in the evening after she had left there for England. Fortunately all aboard were able to leave the ship in two boats before the fire reached the magazine, which exploded; there were no deaths. Sir Stamford Raffles (former Governor-General of British Bencoolen (1817–1822)), and Lady Raffles were among the passengers who were rescued. Captain Young, his passengers, including Sir Stamford and Lady Raffles and their children, and Fame's crew shipped aboard Mariner for the voyage to England. They sailed from Fort Marlborough on 10 April via the Cape of Good Hope. They were at St Helena on 3 July and reached England by 22 August.

==== Second convict voyage (1825) ====
In 1825 Mariner's master was Herbert, changing to "Fotherby", and she was trading between London and India. The year earlier she had undergone a "good repair".

Mariner departed Cork on 12 March 1825 with William Fotherly, master. She arrived at Port Jackson on 10 July. She had embarked 113 female convicts, one of whom died during the voyage. (Note: One source reports that on 16 July 1826 Mariner's crew abandoned her in a sinking state on her passage from London for the Cape of Good Hope and India after she had been badly damaged by a very heavy sea the previous day. That was clearly a different Mariner as the Mariner of this article continued to make many more voyages.)

==== Third convict voyage (1827) ====
Captain Robert Nosworthy sailed Mariner from Cork on 14 January 1827. She left the Cape of Good Hope on 28 March, having picked up some six more prisoners, who had been sentenced to transportation for crimes they had committed there. She arrived at Port Jackson on 23 May. Mariner embarked 161 male prisoners and two died on the voyage. A detachment from the 39th Regiment of Foot provided the guard. Mariner sailed for Batavia, leaving there on 29 October, and arriving at Cowes on 27 February 1828.

=== Transport ===
The Register of Shipping for 1829 shows Mariner, Swinton, master, sailing between London and New South Wales. The entry is unchanged for 1830. Swinton reported that on 20 April 1831, as Mariner was sailing from London to Miramichi, New Brunswick, he had sighted an uncharted rock (named Mariner's Rock), at 46°0′N 29°37′W. Later investigation found the water at that point to be 1760 fathoms deep and there to be no sign of any rock.

Lloyd's Register for 1835 gives no more information than that the name of Mariner's master was Wickman. Lloyd's Register for 1840 shows Mariner with Bartlett, master, Tebbut & Co., owner, and trade London—Quebec. Lloyd's Register for 1845 shows her master as J.Beckett, and her trade as London−Quebec, changing to London−North America. Lloyd's Register for 1851 has J. Walker as master, and trade Liverpool—Africa, changing to London—Africa.

== Fate ==
Mariner appears for the last time in the 1856 volume of Lloyd's Register with J. Walker as master, Redman & Co. as owner, and trade as London—Africa.
