= Navroji Mistri =

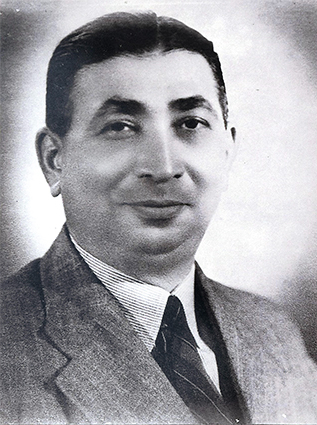
- Born: Navroji Rastomji Mistri; 3 June 1885; Bombay, British Raj
- Died: 29 October 1953 (aged 68); Colony of Singapore
- Resting place: Parsi Cemetery - Tampines then moved to Parsi Cemetery Chua Chu Kang, Singapore
- Occupation: Entrepreneur

Navroji Rastomji Mistri OBE (3 June 1885 – 29 October 1953) was a Parsi Indian entrepreneur and philanthropist. Known as the “godfather of the poor” or the “bachelor godfather” of Singapore's poor children, Mistri donated a large part of his wealth towards the improvement of medical services in Singapore. He ran a successful soda drinks business in Singapore. Both Mistri Road, near Shenton Way, and Mistri Wing at the Singapore General Hospital were named in his honour.

== Early life ==
Navroji was born into a Parsi family on 3 June 1885 in Mumbai, India. An engineer by training, Navroji started work at the Royal Indian Marine Dockyards. While in India, the young Navroji reportedly met Jamsetji Tata, the founder of the Tata group, who told Navroji that "When you grow up and if you work hard, you will be a success.". In 1909, Navroji moved to Singapore after being employed to work on the building Keppel Harbour's graving dock. He had only 10 rupees when he arrived in Singapore.

== Career ==
While working in Singapore, Navroji met Phirozshaw Framroz, a well-known soft drinks producer through the small Parsis community in Singapore. He started helping out at Framroz's soft-drinks factory by fixing machinery. Upon completion of the graving dock in 1913, Framroz employed Navroji as a manager in his factory. In 1925, Navroji left the company to set up his own soft drinks factory. He named his company "Phoenix Aerated Water" as "the phoenix is a big bird rising from the dead and he liked the sound of that". His new business venture negatively affected his relations with Framroz, as Navroji had previously signed an agreement to not start a similar business when he left Framroz's company. The dispute was brought before the courts, who eventually ruled in Navroji's favour. The pair's relations were not restored until shortly before Navroji's death.

Navroji's soft drinks business grew quickly. He was able to convince the British armed forces to permit him to sell his drinks in both Malaya and India. As a result, his drinks were sold across Malaya and the South-east Asian region. In 1931, he also opened G. H. Café, which offered the popular curry tiffin meals together with Phoenix Aerated Water's drinks.

== Philanthropy ==
While being treated at the Singapore General Hospital, Navroji asked his doctor and close friend Professor Gordon Ransome about why sick children had to sleep along the corridors of the hospital. In reply, Professor Ransome jokingly asked that since he was rich, why don't he contribute money to build a paediatric ward? Having heard this, he presented a SGD$950,000 check to the hospital for the construction of a third-class hospital ward for non-paying patients, saying that

"I cannot bear to think of sick children, and their mothers lying on the floors of hospital wards...because of the shortage of space and funds".

Using these funds, the government built a $1,500,000 block that housed two 150-bed paediatric wards that were equipped with the latest medical equipment of the day. However, Navroji died before the hospital wing was completed in 1955. Thus, the wing, named "Mistri Wing", was opened by his brother Hormusji Mistri.

Prior to this donation, Navroji had already donated SGD$50,000 to the University of Malaya to provide funds for the purchasing of equipment used in medical research and studies.

In his will, Navroji bequeathed half of his estate, worth SGD$1 million, to set up the Mistri Singapore Trust and the Mistri Bombay Trust. The beneficiaries of the Mistri Singapore Trust includes poor children, schoolchildren who faced financial difficulties and tuberculosis sufferers. The remainder of his estate was left to his family members, friends and former employees.

== Recognition ==
For his role in sheltering homeless people during the Japanese Occupation of Singapore, the British King awarded Navroji the Order of the British Empire in 1946. The award was given under the name "Noel R. Mistri". In 1955, the British colonial government named a road "Mistri Road" in his honour. This road, located near Shenton Way, is one of several roads in the area that were named after Parsis. This was because the area used to be a burial ground for the Parsis in Singapore.

Mistri Wing, the paediatric ward which was built with Navroji's donations, was also named in his honour. The hospital wing still exists today at the Singapore General Hospital, though it now houses the National Heart Centre Singapore. It will soon be converted into a centre for diabetic care.
