= Tsao Chieh =

Singaporean composer and engineer

Tsao Chieh (Chinese: 曹节; 1953–1996) was a Singaporean composer and engineer.

== Works ==
=== Orchestra ===
1982–1983 Overture in C

1984–1985 Singapore, Symphonic Suite for large orchestra: Prelude & Fugue, March, Scherzo, Passacaglia, Finale

1987–1988 Stasis

1989–1990 Amidst the sough of winds...., set to two poems (Finger of the Cape und A Boy Drowns) by Edwin Thumboo for Narrator and Orchestra

1991–1992 Prelude, Interlude and Fugato, for Orchestra

1994 Two Little Pieces, for Orchestra: Idyll, Dance

=== Symphonic Band ===
1988 Singapore Artillery Centennial March

=== Vocal music ===
1984 Four Songs from Romantic Poets, for Soprano and Chamber ensemble

1995 Old House at Ang Siang Hill, for Soprano and Piano

=== Chamber music ===
197? Romance, for Clarinet and Viola

1980 Canzone, for Flute and Piano

1980 Roundelay, for Flute and Piano

1981 Idyll, for Flute and Piano

1982 Toccata, for Flute and Piano

1984 Caprice, for two Flute and Piano

1984 Movements, for Flute, Piano and String Quartet

1988 Variations, for Chamber ensemble [for New Music Forum II in January 18, 1989)

=== Piano Solo ===
1971 Canzona

1983 Sonata

=== Electronic music ===
1994 Sine.Mus

1994–1995 Test piece for KW, for Computer

1994–1995 Rhapsody for synthesized flute on a 17-tone scale

1994–1995 Study in four temperaments
