= Malcolm David Picton Gilroy =

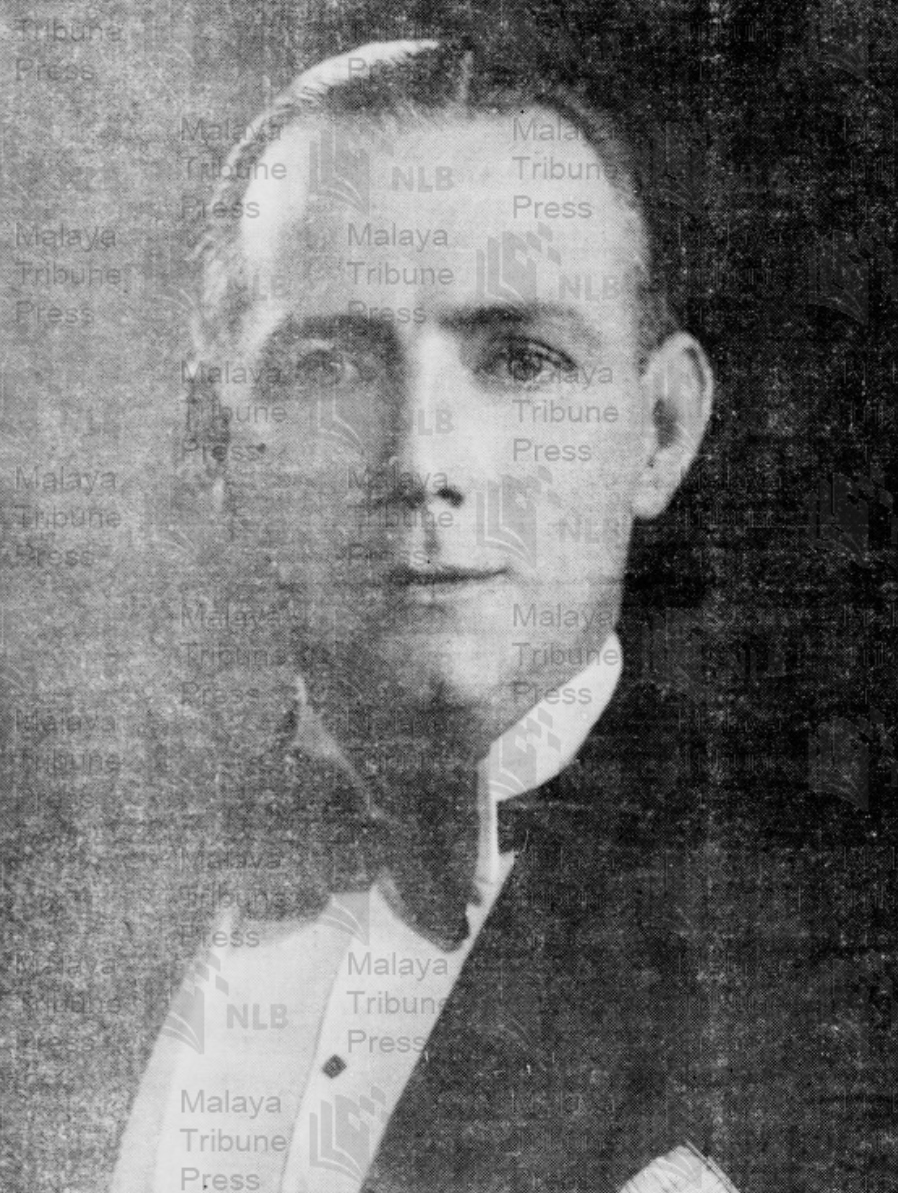
Gilroy in 1938.

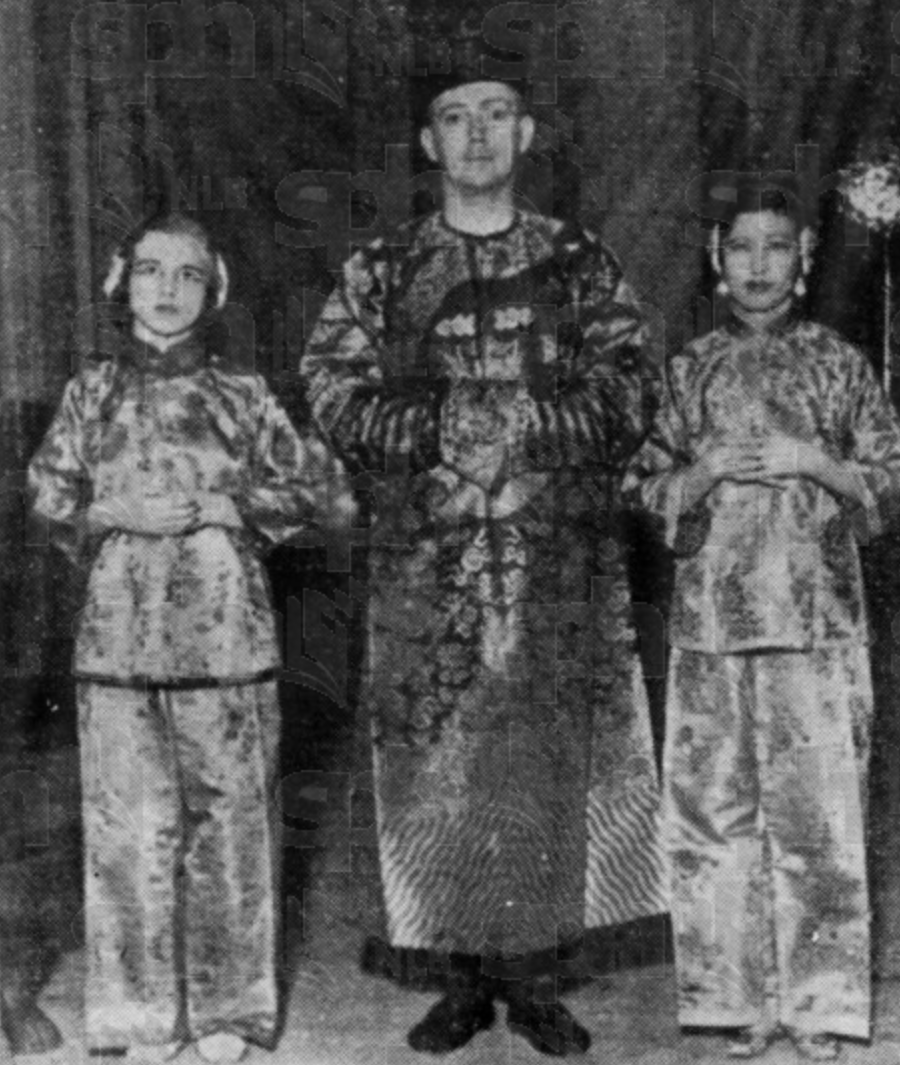
Gilroy (centre) performing in Magic, Myrth and Mystery.

Malcolm David Picton Gilroy (1902 – 1 April 1952) was a prominent amateur stage magician in Singapore who served as the president of the Malayan Magic Society, of which he was a founder.

== Early life and education ==
Gilroy was born in Singapore in 1902. He received his education at the Penang Free School, from which he graduated in 1918.

== Career ==
By May 1925, Gilroy had become an employee of the Asiatic Petroleum Company. In August of the following year, he was elected a member of the Singapore branch of the Straits Settlements Association. In September 1932, he was appointed the manager of the Asiatic Petroleum Company in Penang following the retirement of C. M. Merrick. By May 1933, he had instead been transferred to the company's branch in Malacca as manager.

In November 1935, Gilroy was elected the president of the general committee of the Malayan Magic Circle, which was officially founded the day before. According to fellow magician Tan Hock Chuan, Gilroy had been the "prime mover" in establishing the organisation. He was among the members of the circle who performed in its first major show, called Magic, Myrth and Mystery, which was staged at the Victoria Theatre on 1, 2 and 4 April 1936. His act in the show was called "Symphony in Cards and Silks". A critic from The Malaya Tribune wrote: "To him, getting things out of nowhere and sending them back again to goodness knows where seemed child's play." The show then went on tour across the region, with performances in Muar, Malacca and then at the Pavilion Theatre in Kuala Lumpur in February 1937.

Gilroy performed in the Malayan Magic Circle's major production for 1937. Called Subtleties, it was staged at the Victoria Theatre on 16, 18 and 19 June with a matinee performance on 17 June. He appeared alongside Harry Miller and Jeanette Ainslie in the "Vicious Circle" act, which involved "several mystifying tricks" being "bound together by amusing patter". In the same month, Gilroy was awarded the Gold Star from The Magic Circle in London for his role in the formation of the Malayan Magic Circle. He then acted as Ludlow in a presentation of the Ivor Novello comedy play Fresh Fields, staged at the Victoria Theatre in aid of the Poppy Day Fund on 10, 12 and 13 November. The following year, he appeared as Jarvis in a production of the J. Hartley Manners comedy play Peg o' My Heart, staged at the Victoria Theatre in May.

Gilroy was replaced as the president of the Malayan Magic Circle by W. T. Cherry at a general meeting held on 8 December 1939. He was instead elected the organisation's honorary treasurer. However, at a general meeting in November 1940, he was re-elected the president of the circle. He also participated in the Malayan Magic Circle's monthly shows for troops in Singapore at the Victoria Theatre, called "Out of the Hat", which began in June 1941. A critic from The Singapore Free Press opined that the show was "held up worthily by such well-known magicians as M. D. P. Gilroy and Tan Hock Chuan".

Gilroy had left Singapore by the beginning of the Japanese Occupation in February 1942. In this period, most of the props belonging to the members of the Malayan Magic Circle were destroyed. He returned to Singapore after the occupation ended in September 1945. He then revived the circle. In November, he was appointed the Officer-In-Charge of the Petroleum Board in Malacca, which had been formed by the temporary British Military Administration at the former premises of the Asiatic Petroleum Company branch there. He was appointed the manager of the Shell branch in Ipoh in this period. Gilroy was elected a member of the Federated Malay States Chamber of Commerce in Kuala Lumpur in April 1948. By September 1950, he had been appointed the manager of the Singapore branch of Shell. By July 1951, he had instead been appointed the branch's public relations manager.

== Personal life and death ==
Gilroy married Jessie McKenzie McMillan of Aberdeen at a Presbyterian church on 27 September 1926. In 1938, he became the captain of the Island Golf Club. He was re-elected to the position the following year.

On 1 April 1952, Gilroy had been out playing golf with E. A. Keeble of the Sarawak Oilfields Seria when they had decided to take shelter with their two caddies in a hut due to an oncoming thunderstorm. However, the hut was soon struck by lightning, killing Gilroy and his caddie and injuring Keeble's caddie. Gilroy's burial at the Bidadari Cemetery was attended by over 200, including the Legislative Councillors and City Councillors, Shell employees and Tan Hock Chuan, representing the International Brotherhood of Magicians. Tan performed a ceremony in which he took a teak wand, broke it over the grave, dropped it in and bowed. Tan later recalled that after Gilroy's death, the Malayan Magic Circle "really died off", and though there were a few revival attempts, only around a dozen were interested and meetings from then on were attended by only five or six members.
