= Changi Cottage =

Building in Changi, Singapore

Coordinates: 1°23′32″N 103°58′58″E

- Interactive map of the Changi Cottage area

General information
- Status: Completed
- Type: cottage
- Location: Changi, Singapore, 26 Netheravon Rd, Singapore 508523, Changi, Singapore
- Completed: 1950
- Owner: CSC@Changi Resort
- Landlord: CSC@Changi Resort

Technical details
- Floor count: 1

Changi Cottage is a historic bungalow on Netheravon Road in Changi, Singapore. For several months after Singapore's split from Malaysia, then-Prime Minister of Singapore Lee Kuan Yew, lived and worked at the bungalow.

== History ==
The seaside bungalow was built at a cost of $24,943.83 in 1950. Following Singapore's split from Malaysia, then-Prime Minister of Singapore Lee Kuan Yew spent several months living and working at the bungalow. Until the 1980s, the bungalow continued to serve as the holiday home for senior members of the government. In January 1971, Sir Alec Douglas-Home, then the Foreign Secretary of the United Kingdom, was hosted at the bungalow. The building currently stands on the grounds of the Civil Service Club's CSC@Changi Resort. It was renovated and restored.

On 22 November 2023, a Node showcasing resources about Lee Kuan Yew that had been installed at the bungalow was unveiled. The Node, which is available only to those staying at the bungalow, was introduced to commemorate Lee's 100th birthday, which fell on 16 September of that year. By then, the bungalow had become one of the most popular chalets in Singapore, having attained a weekend occupancy of 88 per cent in 2023. The Jelutong, which was one of Lee's favourite trees, was planted at the cottage by Minister-in-charge of Public Service Chan Chun Sing, National Library Board chief executive officer Ng Cher Pong, Civil Service Club executive Charlie Ng and several others. The madagascar almond, tembusu, raintree and sea apple, which were also some of Lee's favourite trees, were also planted within the grounds of the bungalow. The National Heritage Board placed the cottage on the Changi Heritage Trail in April 2024.
