= William George Stirling =

British official (1887–1951)

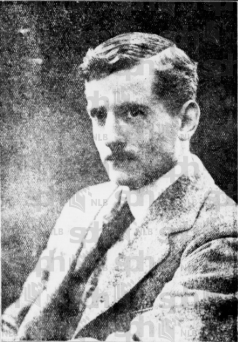
- Stirling in 1925
- Born: August 25, 1887; Melton Mowbray, Leicester
- Died: October 11, 1951 (aged 64)
- Occupations: Artist, sculptor, and criminologist

William George Stirling (25 August 1887 – 11 October 1951) was an English artist, sculptor, criminologist, and Assistant Protector of Chinese in Singapore.

== Early life ==
Stirling was born on 25 August 1887 in the Sysonby House in Melton Mowbray, Leicester. He later became a boarder at the Warren Hill School in Eastbourne, East Sussex. From 1901 to 1905, he attended Harrow School in London. While he was still attending school, he joined the Japan Society in London, due to his fascination with the Far East.

== Career ==
Stirling arrived in British Malaya in 1907, where he worked in a rubber plantation. He joined the Chinese Protectorate in Malacca in 1915. In October 1918, he was appointed to act as an Assistant Superintendent of Government Monopolies. He served as an Assistant Protector of Chinese in Singapore from 1921 to 1931. He retired in 1932 and returned to England.

Somewhere in 1934, he went to study at the Lyons Criminology Institute under French criminologist Edmond Locard for three years, during which he invented the synchrisiscope.

== Personal life ==
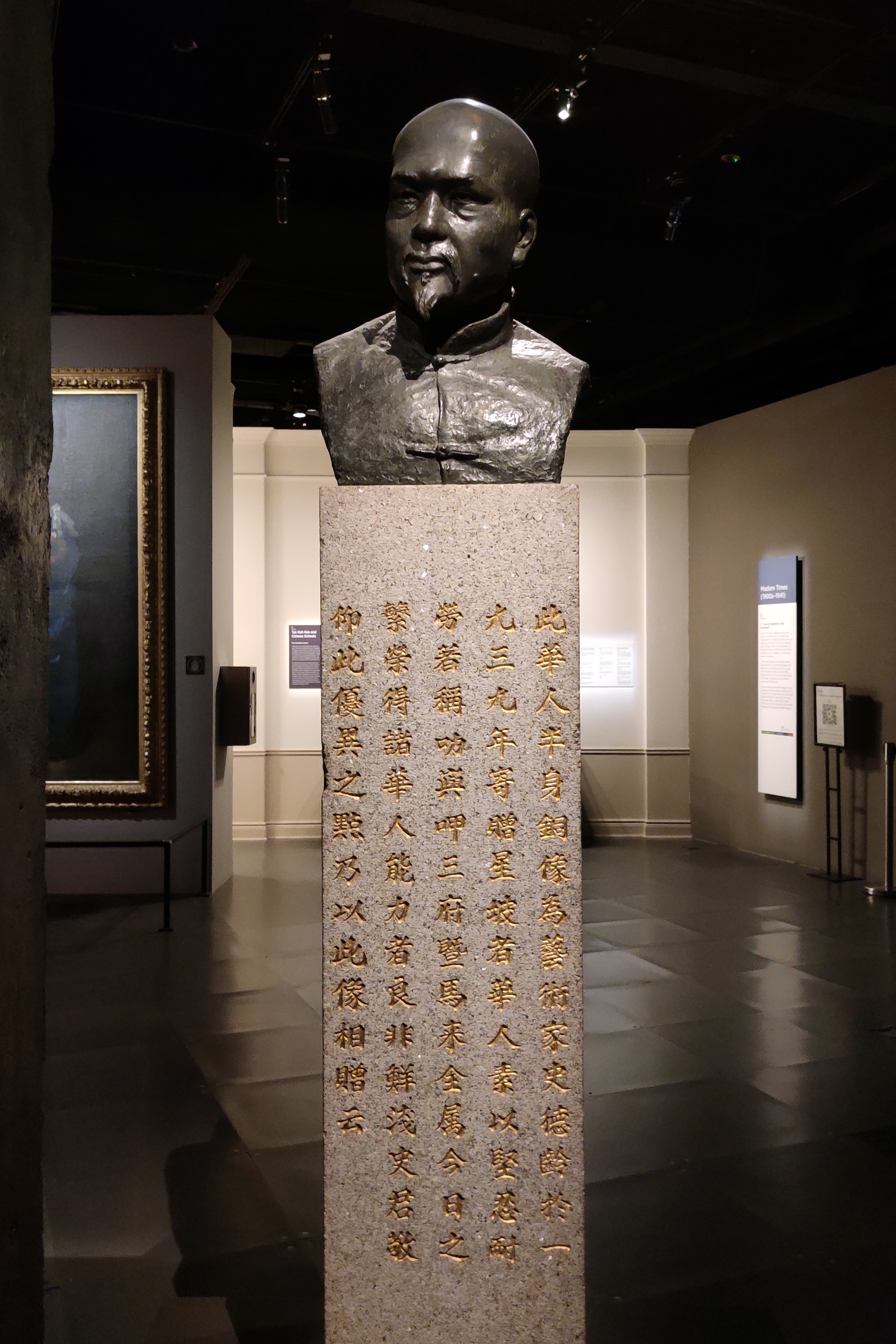
Bust of a Chinese Gentleman (1939)

Stirling was married to Chan Chee Man Wan. Together, they had one daughter, Mary, who was born in 1918. His hobbies included drawing.

In December 1926, he was cut several times with a man by a man while trying to resolve a conflict between the man and his wife. The man had attacked his wife after she stated that she did not want to return to him, after which Stirling interfered and was then attacked by the man. The man later attempted to commit suicide by stabbing himself.

Following his retirement to London, he began to develop his talent for sculpting. In March 1936, two of his bronze sculptures, with one depicting a Chinese boy actor, and the other depicting a Malay boy, were purchased by the Municipal Commission of Singapore using the money Karel Willem Van Kleef had donated. In January 1939, he presented three of the busts he sculpted, Bust of a Chinese Gentleman, a bust of Arjuna, and a bust of a Chinese girl, to the National Museum of Singapore, then known as Raffles Museum.

Stirling died on 11 October 1951 in St Charles' Hospital in Kensington, London. His funeral was held on 17 October.

In 1956, his wife demonstrated the cooking of Chinese food to Queen Elizabeth The Queen Mother. She died in Hong Kong in 1977.

== Legacy ==
Stirling Road was named after Stirling in 1956.
