= Fame (1818 ship) =

History

United Kingdom
- Name: Fame
- Owner: Joseph Dawson (Dowson)
- Builder: H.J.W. Pitcher, Northfleet
- Launched: 3 October 1818
- Fate: Burnt 1824

General characteristics
- Tons burthen: 430, or 433, or 450, or 500 (bm)
- Propulsion: Sail
- Notes: Three decks

Fame was built at Northfleet in 1818. She made one voyage under charter to the British East India Company (EIC). A fire destroyed her in 1824 during her second voyage for the EIC.

== Career and loss ==
Fame entered Lloyd's Register in 1819 with C. Jordain, master, changing to Remmington, and trade London—India.

Captain Samuel Remmington sailed from the Downs on 27 May 1819, bound for Bengal. Fame arrived at Saugor on 5 October, and was at Kidderpore 10 days later. Homeward bound, she was at Diamond Harbour on 12 February 1820, reached St Helena on 7 May, and arrived at Blackwall on 10 July.

Captain Charles Young sailed from the Downs on 27 May 1823, bound for Bengal and Bencoolen.

On 2 February 1824, Fame caught fire about 50 miles southwest of Bencoolen in the evening after she had left there for England. A fire started when a careless steward carrying a candle accidentally ignited fumes while drawing brandy from a cask in a storeroom. Fortunately all aboard were able to leave the ship in two boats before the fire reached the magazine, which exploded. Sir Stamford Raffles (former Governor-General of Bencoolen (1817–1822)), and Lady Raffles were among the passengers who were rescued.

Because of the fire, all aboard Fame lost their personal possessions. Raffles lost his papers (packed in 122 cases), and he and his wife lost a great deal of valuable jewelry. The EIC valued its cargo on board at £15,446.

In the aftermath of the fire Captain Young, his passengers, including Sir Stamford and Lady Raffles and their children, and Fame's crew shipped aboard Mariner for the voyage to England. They sailed from Fort Marlborough on 10 April via the Cape of Good Hope. They were at St Helena on 3 July, and reached England by 22 August.
