= 1977 in Singapore =

- Decades: 1950s; 1960s; 1970s; 1980s; 1990s
- See also: Other events of 1977; Timeline of Singaporean history

The following lists events that happened during 1977 in Singapore.

== Incumbents ==
- President: Benjamin Henry Sheares
- Prime Minister: Lee Kuan Yew

== Events ==
=== February ===
- 27 February – The Upper Peirce Reservoir is officially opened as Singapore's fourth reservoir. On the same day, a 10-year plan to clean up the Singapore River is announced by the late Lee Kuan Yew.

=== May ===
- 28 May – Singapore defeats Penang by 3–2 during the 1977 Malaysia Cup match at Stadium Merdeka, Kuala Lumpur.

=== June ===
- 13 June – The first double-decker bus is launched on service 86 by Singapore Bus Service (now SBS Transit).

=== July ===
- 23 July – Big Splash opens in East Coast Park as a waterpark.
- 31 July – Senoko Power Station is officially opened as Singapore's fifth power station.

=== December ===
- 10 December – The Science Centre Singapore (then Singapore Science Centre) is officially opened.
- 12 December – The Singapore Labour Foundation is formed to ensure families in unions are well-taken care of, as well as to promote union groups in Singapore.

=== Date unknown ===
– The World Trade Centre is completed.

== Births ==
- 13 January – Ong Teng Koon, former PAP Member of Parliament for Sembawang GRC and Masiling-Yew Tee GRC.
- 8 February – Mariam Jaafar, PAP Member of Parliament for Sembawang GRC.
- 17 April
  - Jaime Teo, artiste and singer, co-founder of Twelve Cupcakes.
  - Jamie Yeo, artiste and radio DJ.
- 22 April – Michelle Chong, producer and director.
- 18 July – Alfian Sa'at, playwright.
- 17 September – David Neo, Minister for Culture, Community and Youth.
- 24 October – Eunice Olsen, former Nominated Member of Parliament and actress.
- 22 November – Gerald Giam, Workers' Party Member of Parliament for Aljunied GRC.
- Tan Kiat How, PAP Member of Parliament for East Coast GRC.
- Yip Hon Weng, PAP Member of Parliament for Yio Chu Kang SMC.

== Deaths ==
- 5 February – Tan Siak Kew, prominent businessman, nominated member of the Legislative Assembly, president of the Singapore Chinese Chamber of Commerce, diplomat and philanthropist (b. 1903).
- 14 February – N. Govindasamy, PAP Member of Parliament for Radin Mas Constituency (b. 1928).
- 18 March – Chong Moong Seng, Hakka community leader, businessman and philanthropist (b. 1900).
- 20 March – Kwa Siew Tee, former General Manager of the Overseas Chinese Bank (b. 1888).
- 15 April – Jiang Ling, Chinese literature author and educator (b. 1913).
- 22 June – Jee Ah Chian, one of Singapore's pioneer public accountants and former City Councillor (b. 1894).
- 4 July – Michael Olcomendy, 1st Catholic Archbishop of Singapore (b. 1901).
- 3 August – Lim Guan Hoo, former Parliamentary Secretary to the Ministry of Home Affairs and former PAP Member of Parliament for Bukit Merah Constituency (b. 1939).
- 12 October – Francis Thomas, former Principal of Saint Andrew's School and former Minister of Communications and Works (b. 1912).
- 15 November – Pang Tee Pow, 4th Chairman of the Housing and Development Board (b. 1928).
- 18 November – Li Vei-Chen, former Press Secretary to Prime Minister Lee Kuan Yew (b. 1902).
- 27 December – Soh Ghee Soon, former Liberal Socialist Party legislative assemblyman for Cairnhill Constituency (b. 1903).
