= 1975 in Singapore =

- Decades: 1950s; 1960s; 1970s; 1980s; 1990s
- See also: Other events of 1975; Timeline of Singaporean history

The following lists events that happened during 1975 in Singapore.

== Incumbents ==
- President: Benjamin Henry Sheares
- Prime Minister: Lee Kuan Yew

== Events ==
=== January ===
- 1 January – The Singapore Maritime Museum is opened in Sentosa, albeit still under construction.

=== February ===
- 19 February – The first SAFRA clubhouse is opened in Toa Payoh.

=== April ===
- 1 April – The Singapore Air Defence Command is renamed to the Republic of Singapore Air Force.
- 30 April – The new Royal Sporting House outlet officially opens.

=== June ===
- 2 June –
  - The Area Licensing Scheme (ALS) was launched in a bid to control traffic into the city, the world's first area licensing scheme.
  - The Jurong Town Hall is officially opened. It served as the headquarters of the Jurong Town Corporation (now JTC Corporation) until 2000, spearheading Singapore's economy.

=== July ===
- 30 July – The World Trade Centre will be ready by 1977.

=== September ===
- 15 September – The Subordinate Courts Building (present day State Courts) starts operations, centralising various courts which were scattered around the city at that time including the Criminal District and Magistrates' Court; the Traffic Courts; and the Civil District Courts.
- 24 September – The last British warship, HMS Mermaid, left Sembawang Naval Basin.

=== November ===
- 20 November – Amendments to the Misuse of Drugs Act were passed to introduce the mandatory death penalty for drug trafficking cases.

=== Date unknown ===
- The Kranji Reservoir and Pandan Reservoir are completed.
- DBS Building Tower One is completed.
- 3S Transport Pte Ltd starts operations as Singapore's second private charter bus company after Woodlands Transport the previous year.

== Births ==
- 20 January – Emma Yong, actress, member of Dim Sum Dollies (d. 2012).
- 28 January – Tanya Chua, singer.
- 18 May – Constance Song, actress and entrepreneur.
- 12 March – Sim Ann, Second Minister for Foreign Affairs.
- 6 June – Faisal Manap, former Workers' Party Member of Parliament for Aljunied GRC.
- 12 June – Jacelyn Tay, former actress and health professional.
- 19 September – Michelle Chia, actress.
- 24 September – Calvin Cheng, former Nominated Member of Parliament.
- 7 October – Kam Ning, violinist.
- 19 November – Poh Li San, PAP Member of Parliament for Sembawang West SMC.
- 6 December – Vincent Ng, martial artist and actor.
- 27 December – Daniel Ong, artiste and radio DJ and co-founder of Twelve Cupcakes.
- Tan Wu Meng, former PAP Member of Parliament for Jurong GRC.

== Deaths ==
- 14 January – Foo Chee Fong, Chinese businessman and Hainanese community leader (b. 1898).
- 13 February – Franklin Gimson, 1st Governor of Singapore (b. 1890).
- 24 March – Lim Cheng Lock, former PAP Member of Parliament for River Valley Constituency and Kampong Kapor Constituency (b. 1924).
- 28 March – Goh Su Chiang, former Principal of Chiang Teck School, Singapore People's Alliance and Singapore Alliance Party candidate for Sepoy Lines Constituency in the 1959 and 1963 general elections (b. 1904).
- 20 June – Alan Rose, 1st Chief Justice of the State of Singapore (b. 1899).
- 20 July – Syed Ibrahim bin Omar Alsagoff, head of local Arab companies and consul for several Arab countries (b. 1899).
- 22 September – Ng See Yook, former Director of Medical Services and Permanent Secretary to the Ministry of Health (b. 1913).
- 26 September – Ng Quee Hock, businessman (b. 1927).
- 3 October – Fong Kim Heng, former PAP legislative assemblyman for Joo Chiat Constituency (b. 1923).
- 6 November – Wilfred Lawson Blythe, 2nd Colonial Secretary of Singapore (b. 1896).
- 13 November – Neo Ao Tiew, Chinese businessman, philanthropist and prominent community leader in Lim Chu Kang (b. 1884).
- 23 November – Wong Shian Yein, former Chairman of Sam Kiang Huay Kwan and Democratic Party candidate for Kampong Kapor Constituency in the 1955 General Election (b. 1908).
