= 1971 in Singapore =

- Decades: 1950s; 1960s; 1970s; 1980s; 1990s
- See also: Other events of 1971; Timeline of Singaporean history

The following lists events that happened during 1971 in Singapore.

== Incumbents ==
- President: Yeoh Ghim Seng (Acting) (23 November 1970 to 2 January), Benjamin Henry Sheares (starting 2 January)
- Prime Minister: Lee Kuan Yew

== Events ==
=== January ===
- 1 January – The Monetary Authority of Singapore was established to regulate the financial sector and as Singapore's central bank.
- 2 January – Dr Benjamin Henry Sheares becomes the second President of Singapore.
- 3 January – Jurong Bird Park opens to the public.
- 14–22 January - Singapore hosts the 18th Conference of the Commonwealth Heads of Government Meeting.
- 29 January – The Preservation of Monuments Board was established to identify and safeguard buildings of great historical value and recommend as national monuments.

=== February ===
- 1 February – The National Sports Promotion Board is formed to promote and develop sports in Singapore.

=== March ===
- 15 March – The Staff Training Institute (now the Civil Service College) is established to train civil servants.

=== April ===
- 15–16 April – Singapore, United Kingdom, Malaysia, Australia, and New Zealand sign the Five Power Defence Arrangements. The agreement comes into effect on 1 November the same year.
- 23 April –
  - The Shangri-La Hotel Singapore is opened.
  - The first Concept Plan is unveiled, which proposes a 'Ring Plan'.

=== May ===
- 11 May – Local newspapers Eastern Sun and the Singapore Herald were accused by then-Prime Minister Lee Kuan Yew of having been involved in "black operations". They later shut down on 18 May and 28 May respectively.

=== July ===
- 14 July – The Jurong Drive-in Cinema is opened as Singapore's first and only open-air drive-in cinema. The cinema operated for 15 years until its closure on 30 September 1985.
- 30 July – Singapore's first sex reassignment surgery is performed on a 24-year-old who becomes a woman after the surgery, led by Dr S. S. Ratnam. The surgery is declared a success.

=== October ===
- 23 October – The Sentosa Satellite Earth Station is officially launched, making it Singapore's first Satellite Earth Station.
- 31 October – The last British military forces withdraws from Singapore.

=== November ===
- 2 November – The Central Narcotics Bureau is set up to tackle the problem of drugs in Singapore.
- 7 November – The first Tree Planting Day is launched by Dr Goh Keng Swee in Mount Faber.

=== December ===
- 1 December – The Singapore Traction Company ceases operations.
- 2 December – The Clean Air Act is passed to deal with pollution caused by early industrialisation.
- 29 December – The Gold Bars triple murders saw a gold merchant and his two employees robbed and killed by a group of 10 men. Seven of the 10 men were sentenced to death for the crime; the remaining three were indefinitely detained for lengthy periods before their release.

=== Date unknown ===
- Tower 1 of Mandarin Orchard Singapore is opened.

== Births ==
- 27 January – Fann Wong, actress.
- 30 January – Bryan Wong, actor.
- 23 July – Christopher Lee, Malaysia-born Singaporean actor.
- 29 July – Selena Tan, producer, director, writer and actress.
- 13 October – Chia Shi-Lu, medical practitioner and former politician.
- 1 December – Patrick Tay, politician and lawyer.
- Daren Shiau, writer, lawyer, and environmental activist.

== Deaths ==
- 7 February – Chen Yoh Shoo, former Chairman of the Singapore Chinese Chamber of Commerce and Industry (b. 1900).
- 16 May – Pang Choon Jin, former civil servant and one of the early pioneers of the Buddhist Union in Singapore (b. 1908).
- 25 June – Goh Chew Chua, former Parliamentary Secretary to the Deputy Prime Minister and former PAP legislative assemblyman for Punggol–Tampines Constituency and Tampines Constituency (b. 1897).
- 22 August – Aw Cheng Chye, millionaire, businessman, company director and philanthropist (b. 1924).
- 21 September – Tan Chor Lam, businessman and 1st Chairman of the Nanyang Branch of the Tongmenghui (b. 1884).
- 15 October – Syed Mohamed Alkaff, former President of the Arab Association of Singapore and leader of the Alkaff family (b. 1902).
