= 1972 in Singapore =

- Decades: 1950s; 1960s; 1970s; 1980s; 1990s
- See also: Other events of 1972; Timeline of Singaporean history

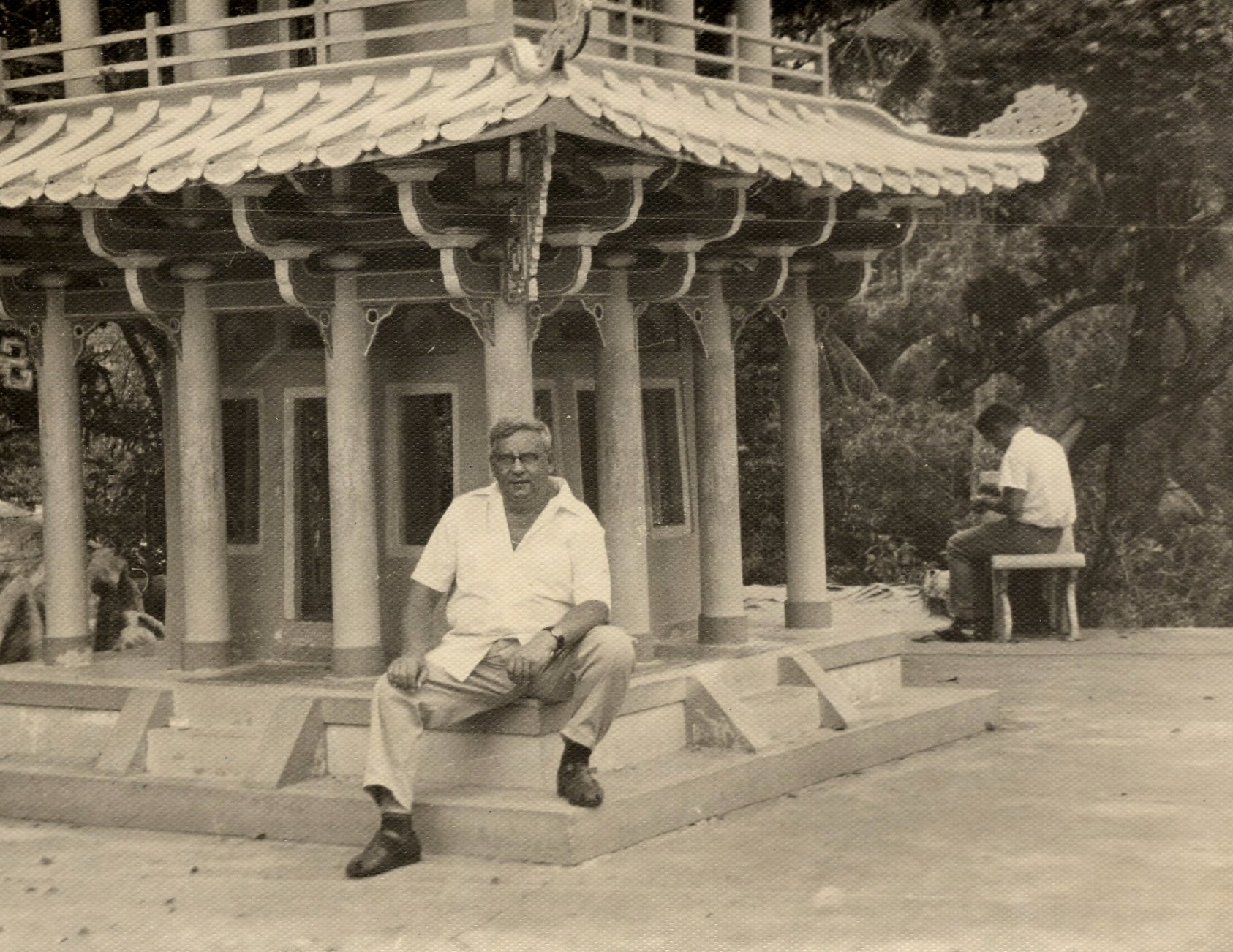
Pavel Kiselev in Singapore, spring 1972. An image from family archive, owned by D.Kiselev

The following lists events that happened during 1972 in Singapore.

== Incumbents ==
- President: Benjamin Henry Sheares
- Prime Minister: Lee Kuan Yew

== Events ==
=== January ===
- 1 January – The Post Office Savings Bank is turned into a statutory board. This allows the bank more freedom to run its operations.

=== February ===
- 7 February – The National Wages Council is set up to ensure sustainable wages. This comes after wages have risen quickly the previous year.

=== April ===
- 1 April – The Telephone Department is converted into a statutory board called the Telecommunication Authority of Singapore.
- 2 April – The Singapore Grand Prix is won by Max Stewart.

=== May ===
- 12 May – The National Productivity Board is formed to encourage productivity.

=== June ===
- 15 June – The SAF Act comes into effect, allowing for effective management of the Singapore Armed Forces. The Act merges the air, sea and land vocations and establishes the Armed Forces Council.

=== July ===
- 2 July – Singapore Armed Forces Reservist Association is officially launched.
- 20 July – The Stop at Two policy is unveiled to encourage people to have smaller families.

=== August ===
- 17 August – Work starts on the Brani Naval Base.

=== September ===
- 1 September – The Sentosa Development Corporation is formed to manage Sentosa and the outlying islands to attract tourists.
- 2 September – The People's Action Party wins the 1972 General Election.
- 15 September – The first Merlion Park is officially opened.
- 18 September – 22-year-old Chan Chee Chan is shot dead while walking through Queenstown; the crime remains unsolved.

=== October ===
- 1 October – Singapore Airlines starts its first flights.
- 13 October – Heavy fog, an environmental phenomenon that had built up since the beginning of the month, causes gridlock and other problems throughout Singapore.
- 24 October – Disincentives are announced to nudge families into having only two children, taking effect on 1 August 1973. Among them are progressive reduction of income tax relief to the first three children; increase in childbirth fees depending on births; reduction of paid maternity leave from three to two confinements; and lowering priority of HDB flats allocations for large families (more than two children).

=== November ===
- 21 November – A fire engulfs the Robinson's Department Store, causing 9 deaths. In addition, the impact of the fire damaged the roof of the Overseas Union Bank building and forced the Stock Exchange to stop trading for the day. As a result, this makes the fire one of the worst in Singapore's history.

=== December ===
- 15 December -
  - OCBC acquires Four Seas Communications Bank.
  - SATS Ltd is established as a separate company from Singapore Airlines to manage ground operations and inflight catering services.

=== Date unknown ===
- The OG building is officially opened.
- Three Rifles Holdings is founded, becoming a company selling clothes.
- Specialists' Shopping Centre is opened in Orchard Road. It has since been demolished.
- The first Guardian store is opened by Cold Storage.
- Shaw Centre is opened.

== Births ==
- 22 February – Dasmond Koh, actor.
- 26 April – Diana Ser, journalist, media personality.
- 27 May – Lynn Ban, jewellery designer (died 2025)
- 15 September – Kit Chan, singer.
- 30 September – Darren Lim, actor.
- 6 November – Janil Puthucheary, politician.
- 18 December – Lawrence Wong, Prime Minister.
- Alvin Pang - poet.

== Deaths ==
- 5 January – Tan Keng Cheow, Chinese calligrapher, educator and former Principal of Tuan Mong High School (b. 1907).
- 8 February – Wee Thiam Siew, property magnate and industrialist (b. 1894).
- 4 April – Lionel Chan, racing driver (injuries sustained in a crash during the Singapore Grand Prix) (b. 1944).
- 5 May – Chen Su Lan, one of Singapore's first local medical graduates, philanthropist and social reformer (b. 1885).
- 7 May – Ching Kee Sun, Cantonese community leader, businessman and philanthropist (b. 1884).
- 12 July – Mohamed Sidik bin Haji Abdul Hamid, former Malay Union legislative assemblyman for Southern Islands Constituency (b. 1897).
- 10 August – Saminathan Jaganathan, former City Councillor for South Constituency (b. 1920).
- 5 September – Bashir Ahmad Mallal, founder of Malayan Law Journal (b. 1898).
- 11 September – Tan Lark Sye, former Chairman of the Singapore Hokkien Huay Kuan and founder of Nanyang University (b. 1897).
