= Seletar Teleport =

Singaporean satellite earth station

Coordinates: 1.3972°N 103.8343°E

The Seletar Teleport (Chinese: 实里达卫星地面站; Malay: Stesen Satelit Telekomunikasi Seletar) is the third of four satellite earth stations in Singapore after the Bukit Timah Satellite Earth Station in Bukit Timah, and the Sentosa Satellite Earth Station in Sentosa Island. It is located near Lower Seletar Reservoir in Yio Chu Kang, opposite Seletar Expressway (SLE). This station is managed and owned by SingTel.

== See also ==
- Singtel
- Seletar
