= 1969 in Singapore =

- Decades: 1940s; 1950s; 1960s; 1970s; 1980s
- See also: Other events of 1969; Timeline of Singaporean history

The following lists events that happened during 1969 in Singapore.

== Incumbents ==
- President: Yusuf bin Ishak
- Prime Minister: Lee Kuan Yew

== Events ==
=== March ===
- 26 March – The Sentosa Satellite Earth Station is announced, which will take a year to set up.

=== May ===
- 13 May – Ethnic riots break out in Kuala Lumpur, Malaysia, which later spill over to Singapore.
- 19 May – The Singapore Petroleum Company is formed.

=== July ===
- 1 July – The first SAF Day was commemorated.
- 18 July – Radio Television Singapore launches its fifth radio station, the "FM Stereo Service" on 92.4 and 790 kHz.

=== December ===
- 10 December – Floods hit Singapore after heavy rain, leaving five fatalities.

== Births ==
- 10 January – Tan Chuan-Jin, former politician and former speaker.
- 10 February – Poh Lip Meng, national sport shooter (d. 2021).
- 7 March - Huang Biren, actress.
- 9 April - M Ravi, human rights lawyer and activist (d. 2025).
- 14 May – Lim Tong Hai, national football player.
- 17 June – James Lye, former actor.
- 10 July – Hossan Leong, television personality.
- 12 August – Edwin Tong, lawyer and politician.
- 1 September – Lam Pin Min, former doctor and former politician.
- 9 October – Chan Chun Sing, former army general and politician.
- 15 November – Ong Ye Kung, former civil servant and politician.
- Date unknown - Douglas Foo, Founder of Apex-Pal International Ltd (which owns Sakae Sushi), former Nominated Member of Parliament.

== Deaths ==
- 15 March – Percival Frank Aroozoo, former principal of Gan Eng Seng School (b. 1900).
- 8 July – Robert Lim, medical doctor and eldest son of Lim Boon Keng (b. 1897).
- 5 October – John Davies, 1st Attorney-General of the Crown Colony of Singapore (b. 1898).
