= 1974 in Singapore =

- Decades: 1950s; 1960s; 1970s; 1980s; 1990s
- See also: Other events of 1974; Timeline of Singaporean history

The following lists events that happened during 1974 in Singapore.

== Incumbents ==
- President: Benjamin Henry Sheares
- Prime Minister: Lee Kuan Yew

== Events ==
=== January ===
- 26 January – The Brani Naval Base is officially opened as Singapore's first naval base.
- 31 January – Laju incident: Japanese Red Army bombs petroleum tanks at Pulau Bukom and hijacks a ferry boat.

=== February ===
- 15 February – The Singapore Cable Car is officially opened to link up Mount Faber with Sentosa, making it the first system to span a harbour.

=== April ===
- 1 April
  - The Singapore Telephone Board merges into the Telecommunication Authority of Singapore, forming a single statutory board. This will streamline telecommunication services and increase efficiency.
  - The Urban Redevelopment Authority is formed to redevelop the Central Area.

=== June ===
- 25 June – Temasek Holdings is formed to manage investments in government-linked companies (GLCs).

=== July ===
- 7 July – The first colour TV programme is broadcast during the 1974 FIFA World Cup Final.

=== August ===
- 17 August – A second Satellite Earth Station with an antenna is launched at the Sentosa Satellite Earth Station.

== Births ==
- 25 March – Cynthia Koh, actress.
- 26 March – Diana Pang, PAP Member of Parliament for Marine Parade–Bradell Heights.
- 8 April – Adam Khoo, entrepreneur, author, trainer, and stocks and FX trader
- 6 May – Lina Ng, actress and host.
- 16 May – Beatrice Chia, actress and director.
- 24 June – Andrea De Cruz, actress.
- 17 August – Low Yen Ling, PAP Member of Parliament for Bukit Gombak SMC.
- 15 September – Zaqy Mohamad, PAP Member of Parliament for Masiling–Yew Tee GRC.
- 28 September – Gan Siow Huang, PAP Member of Parliament for Marymount SMC.
- 7 October – Evelyn Tan, actress, host, educator and former singer.
- 11 November – Dinesh Vasu Dash, Mayor of South East District.
- 12 December – Michelle Saram-Zecha, businesswoman, former actress and singer.
- Corrinne May, singer.

== Deaths ==
- 7 January – V. K. Nair, former Labour Party city councillor for South Constituency (b. 1909).
- 14 January – Chuang Hui Chuan, businessman, committee member of the Singapore Chinese Chamber of Commerce and member of Force 136 during WW2 (b. 1900).
- 19 February – Nazir Ahmad Mallal, former Progressive Party Member of the Legislative Council for Municipal South–West Constituency and City Constituency (b. 1904).
- 16 March – Thamizhavel G. Sarangapani, founder of Tamil newspaper Tamil Murasu (b. 1903).
