= Bukit Timah Satellite Earth Station =

Satellite Earth Station in Bukit Timah, Singapore

Coordinates: 1.352°N 103.791°E

- 武吉知马卫星地面站; Stesen Satelit Bumi Bukit Timah
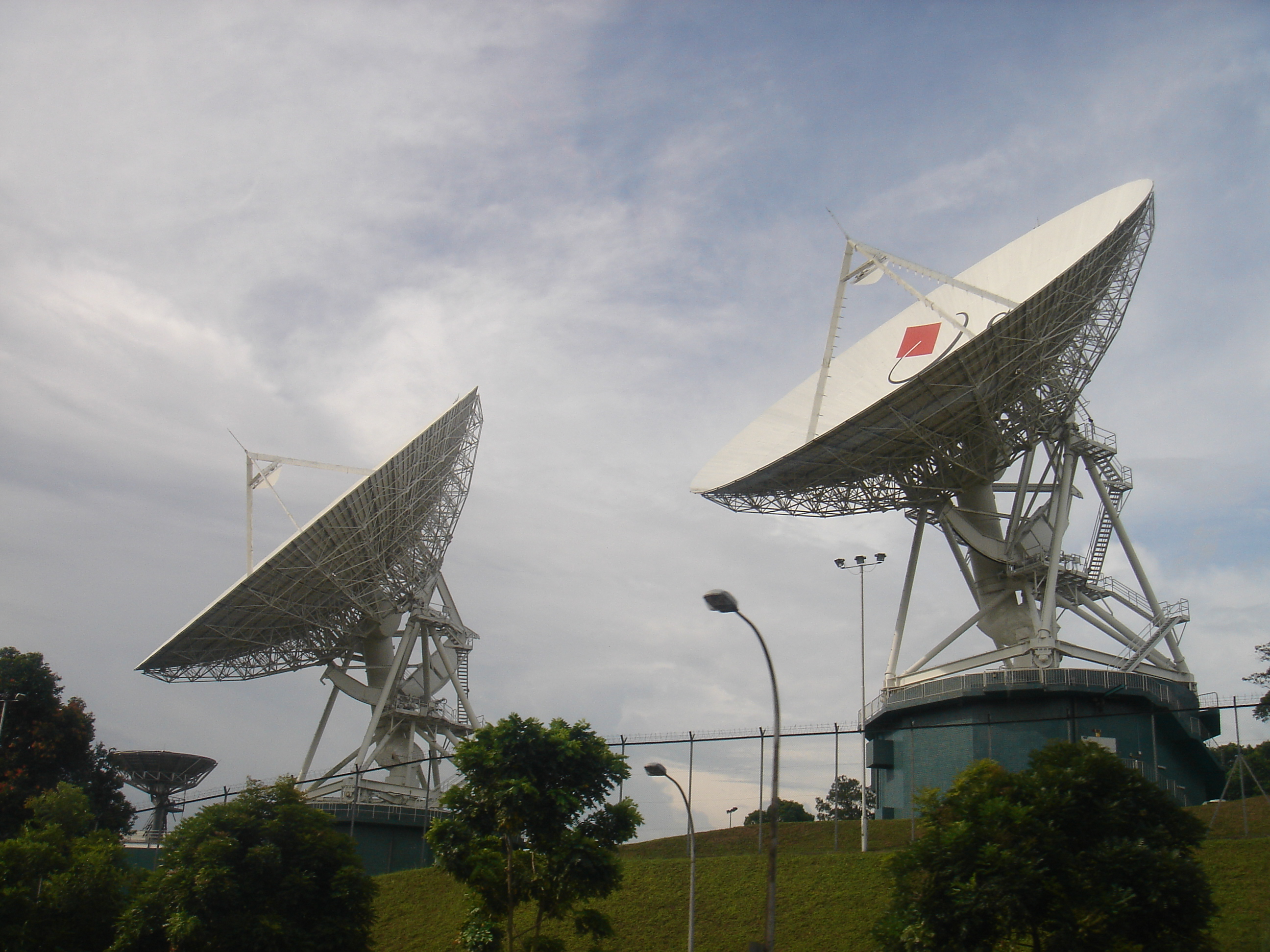
- Former satellite dishes of the Bukit Timah Satellite Earth Station.
- Interactive map of the Bukit Timah Satellite Earth Station area

General information
- Location: 500 Rifle Range Road, Singapore 588397, Singapore
- Construction started: May 1983; 42 years ago
- Completed: 1985; 41 years ago
- Opened: 1986; 40 years ago
- Cost: 65 million
- Owner: Singtel

The Bukit Timah Satellite Earth Station (Chinese: 武吉知马卫星地面站; Malay: Stesen Satelit Bumi Bukit Timah) is the second satellite earth station in Singapore after Sentosa Satellite Earth Station in Sentosa Island.

The station is located in Bukit Timah near Chantek flyover between the Bukit Timah Expressway (BKE) and Pan Island Expressway (PIE). Motorists entering Singapore via the Causeway see this as their first landmark after Woodlands.

In early 2026 the station's two disused satellite dishes were removed.

== History ==
Around the late 1970s to early 1980s, there was a need to construct Singapore's first International Maritime Satellite (Inmarsat) stations by the Telecommunication Authority of Singapore (TAS), with one serving the Pacific region and the other serving the Indian Ocean region, as Singapore was "the world's third busiest port" as well as to "ensure the Republic's position as one of the world's best maritime and communication centres". Since the Sentosa Satellite Earth Station was not able to accommodate additional antennas due to a lack of space, plans for the Pacific region satellite station were made between 1979 and 1980, with a survey conducted for various sites in 1979. By March 1980, two sites were narrowed down, which were Bukit Timah Hill and Tuas, with the final choice made by July 1980. It was ultimately decided to build the station at Bukit Timah Hill with a 30 metres (98 ft) diameter antenna, near Murnane Reservoir due to being further away from airports and having low radio frequency interference, initially costing S$65 million (US$30.76 million). (Note: This included the cost of land, building, civil works, mechanical and electrical services, communication equipment, and the antenna)

On 26 August 1983, the tender call was made by the TAS for the design, manufacture, supply, installation, testing, and commissioning of the satellite station on a semi-turnkey basis, with the call ended at 18 November of the same year. In January 1984, the TAS started the tender call for the satellite station's groundworks, with nine piling contractors participated in the callI. In May of the same year, it was announced that the contract for piling and the earthwork of the station was awarded to Gammon Construction for S$1,995,000 (US$935,265.85), where they were expected to complete it within 15 weeks. By that time, the station as a whole was estimated to cost S$21 million (US$9.94 million), with the project scheduled to be completed by December 1985. Gammon Construction started on 4 May 1984, with an expected completion date of 17 August of the same year. In the same month, it was announced that C Itoh was awarded a S$32 million (US$14.54 million) contract to supply the satellite station with a computerised antenna system. By September 1985, the satellite station was estimated to cost S$60 million (US$27.27 million).

External Media
- Bukit Timah Earth Satellite Station under construction Source: The Straits Times

In July 1986, the station started operations. In May 1987, it was announced that the station would have an additional 32 metres (105 ft) diametre antenna to "increase Singapore's international telecommunications traffic capacity", with the original antenna's diameter changed to 32 metres (105 ft). Bukit Timah Satellite Earth Station opened on 9 May 1987, with Communications and Information Minister Yeo Ning Hong officially opening it. When it opened, it costed in total S$65.5 million (US$48.88 million) to build the satellite station, with S$39 million (US$29.1 million) for the antenna and communication equipment.

In 1995, there were plans to invest an additional S$12,000,000 into installing 3 additional satellite dishes at the Bukit Timah Satellite Earth Station and the Seletar Teleport.

== See also ==
- Singtel
- Sentosa Satellite Earth Station
- Seletar Teleport
