= 1978 in Singapore =

- Decades: 1950s; 1960s; 1970s; 1980s; 1990s
- See also: Other events of 1978; Timeline of Singaporean history

The following lists events that happened during 1978 in Singapore.

== Incumbents ==
- President: Benjamin Henry Sheares
- Prime Minister: Lee Kuan Yew

== Events ==
=== April ===
- 25 April – Police national serviceman Lee Kim Lai was murdered for his revolver by Ong Chin Hock, Yeo Ching Boon and Ong Hwee Kuan. En route to kidnapping him from his sentry post at Mount Vernon, they also killed the taxi driver, Chew Theng Hin.

=== October ===
- 12 October – The Spyros disaster occurred at Jurong Shipyard, resulting in 76 fatalities.

=== November ===
- 10–11 November – Floods occurred in Singapore, leaving 2 fatalities.
- 12–14 November – Then Senior Vice-Premier of the People's Republic of China Deng Xiaoping visits Singapore, setting the foundation for China–Singapore relations before being formally established on 3 October 1990. The governments discussed regional security and Deng visited the HDB.

=== December ===
- 2–3 December – Another flood hit Singapore after about 512 millimetres (20.2 in) of rain fell in just 24 hours, causing 7 fatalities.
- 6–10 December – Evangelist Billy Graham visits Singapore for a crusade.

== Births ==
- 13 February – Desmond Choo, PAP Member of Parliament for Tampines Changkat SMC.
- 11 June – Julian Hee, actor.
- 18 July – Vikram Nair, PAP Member of Parliament for Sembawang GRC.
- 19 July – Lee Li Lian, former Workers' Party Member of Parliament for Punggol East SMC.
- 23 July – Stefanie Sun, singer.
- 23 September – Ben Yeo, actor and host.
- 24 September – Jean Danker, radio DJ.
- 4 October – Amrin Amin, former Senior Parliamentary Secretary to Home Affairs and Health.
- 3 November – Shaun Chen, actor.
- 6 November – Priscelia Chan, actress.

== Deaths ==
- 3 January – Ho Pao Jin, former Principal of the Chinese High School and banker at Far Eastern Bank (b. 1895).
- 25 February – Leong Yuen Ho, Cantonese community leader (b. 1896).
- 27 February – Tan Teck Neo, philanthropist and socialite (b. 1877).
- 26 March – Chan Hock Wah, political detainee (b. 1932).
- 16 April – Abdul Hamid Jumat, former Deputy Chief Minister of Singapore (b. 1917).
- 23 April – Teo Soon Kim, first woman admitted to the Straits Settlements bar (b. 1904).
- 4 June – Perumal Govindaswamy, PAP Member of Parliament for Anson Constituency (b. 1911).
- 1 July – Lee Teck Him, former PAP Member of Parliament for Tiong Bahru Constituency and Ulu Pandan Constituency (b. 1906).
- 13 December – Thio Chan Bee, educationist and former Singapore People's Alliance legislative assemblyman for Tanglin Constituency (b. 1904).
- 26 December – Kam Siew Yee, former trade unionist and political detainee (b. 1930).
