= 1973 in Singapore =

- Decades: 1950s; 1960s; 1970s; 1980s; 1990s
- See also: Other events of 1973; Timeline of Singaporean history

The following lists events that happened during 1973 in Singapore.

== Incumbents ==
- President: Benjamin Henry Sheares
- Prime Minister: Lee Kuan Yew

== Events ==
=== February ===
- 4 February – The first Chingay Parade is held in Singapore.
- 16 February – The Misuse of Drugs Act is passed to deal with the problem of drug abuse more effectively.

=== March ===
- 30 March – RTS partitions its two channels among language lines, after ten years of television broadcasts in all four languages on the same channel. Channel 5 was used to broadcast in English and Malay and Channel 8, Chinese and Tamil.

=== April ===
- 1 April – The Institute of Education is established, taking over the role of the Teachers' Training College which started in 1950. This will boost teaching standards in Singapore.
- 6 April – The Singapore Red Cross Society is incorporated.
- 22 April – The final Singapore Grand Prix is held before the event is discontinued as a result of safety concerns. It was brought back in 2008 as a round of the Formula One World Championship.

=== June ===
- 2 June – The CPF Building starts construction, housing the new headquarters of the Central Provident Fund. The building was completed in 1976, standing for 41 years until its redevelopment in 2017 by Ascendas-Singbridge (now CapitaLand).
- 27 June – Singapore Zoo opens to the public.

=== July ===
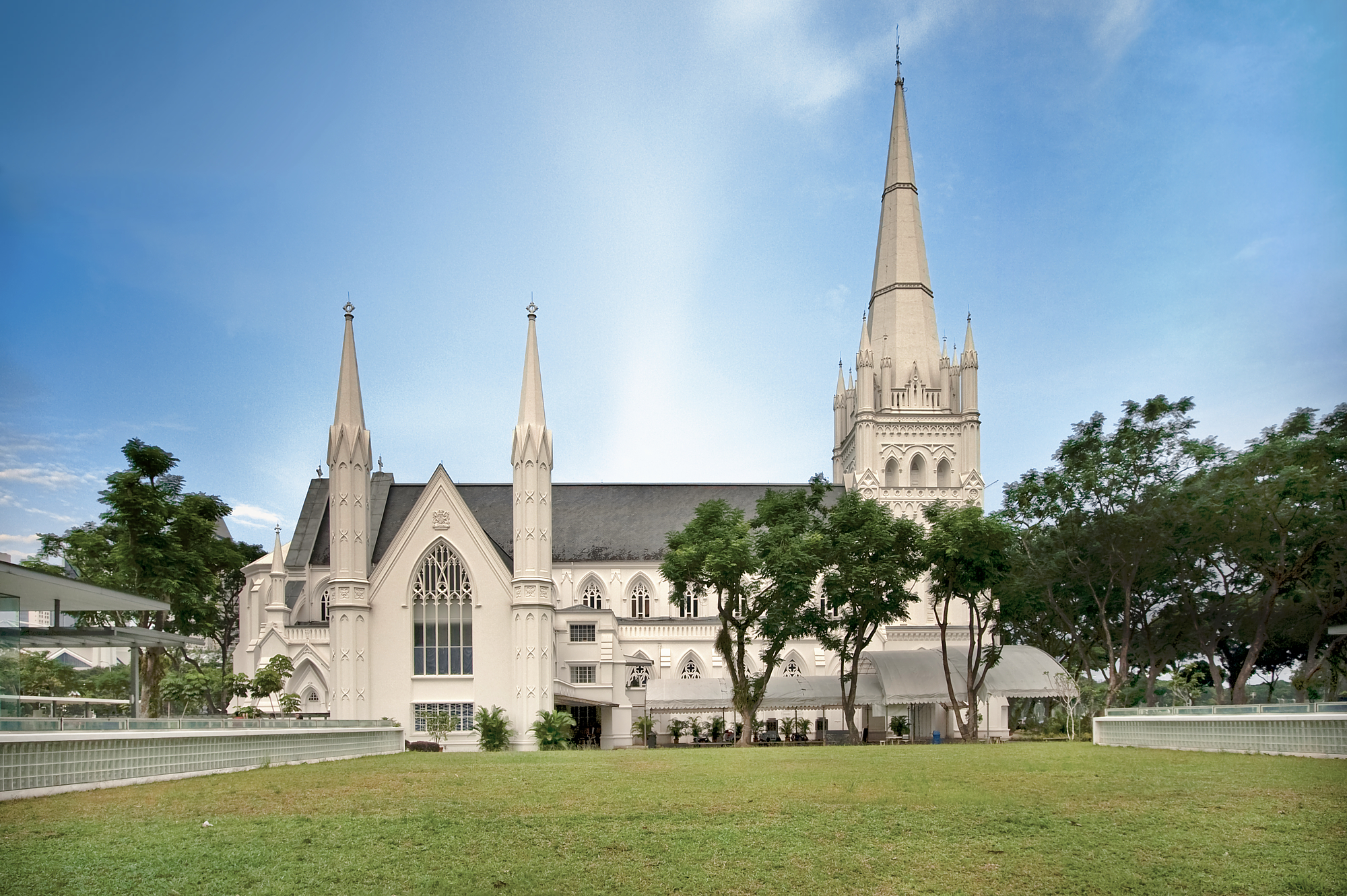
Saint Andrew's Cathedral, Singapore

- 1 July - SBS Transit (Previously known as Singapore Bus Services) was formed in the merger of 3 different private bus companies (United Bus Company, Associated Bus Service, and Amalgamated Bus Company)
- 6 July – St Andrew's Cathedral, Singapore, is gazetted as a national monument.
- 21 July – The National Stadium, in Kallang, is officially opened by Prime Minister Lee Kuan Yew.
- 22 July – The first NTUC Welcome (now NTUC FairPrice) opens its first outlet in Toa Payoh to fight inflation caused by the oil crisis.
- 27 July – For the first time in Singapore, the government executed its first female death row inmate in the country since its independence eight years back. 34-year-old Mimi Wong was earlier sentenced to death by the High Court for the 1970 murder of Ayako Watanabe, and has lost her appeals since. Wong's 40-year-old husband Sim Wor Kum, who assisted her to commit the murder, was also executed on the same day as Wong.

=== September ===
- 1–8 September - Singapore hosts the 7th South East Asian Peninsular Games for the first time. It clinched the second place, accumulating a total of 140 medals.
- 12–14 September - Singapore participates in its first General Agreement on Tariffs and Trade (GATT) event in Tokyo.

=== October ===
- 1 October – The Singapore Sports Council is formed from the merger of National Sports Promotion Board and the National Stadium Corporation. It aims to encourage a healthy lifestyle through sports.

=== Date unknown ===
- Tower 2 of Mandarin Orchard Singapore is opened.
- The People's Park Centre, People's Park Complex and Golden Mile Complex are completed.
- The UIC Building is completed, standing for 39 years until its redevelopment as V on Shenton (Five on Shenton) in 2012, a residential tower completed in 2017.
- UOB Plaza Two is completed as United Overseas Bank's headquarters.
- The Sentosa Musical Fountain opens alongside the Fountain Gardens in Sentosa.

== Births ==
- 16 July – Ivy Lee, actress.
- 22 July – Vernetta Lopez, radio presenter, actress.
- 24 August – Mike Kasem, radio presenter.
- 29 October – Saktiandi Supaat, politician and economist.
- 4 November – Chee Hong Tat, current Minister of National Development.
- Justin Dominic Misson, actor and moderator.

== Deaths ==
- 4 January – Chuang Chu Lin, former Vice Chancellor of Nanyang University and founder of Chung Cheng High School (b. 1900).
- 12 May – Frank Caulfield James, former Progressive Party municipal commissioner for East Constituency (b. 1902).
- 22 June – S. Thiruchelvam, director of the Singapore Toto Pools and former Deputy Secretary to the Ministry of Finance (b. 1926).
- 9 July – Lien Shih Sheng, former Chief Editor of Nanyang Siang Pau (b. 1907).
- 12 July – Ong Poh Heng, off-duty police officer. Ong stopped to intervene in an argument between a bus driver and a gunman along Still Road. The gunman shot him twice, killing him instantly (b. 1945).
- 2 September – Mohammed Sanusi Bin Siraj, police officer, killed by a runaway vehicle at the Paya Lebar Police Station.
