= 1976 in Singapore =

- Decades: 1950s; 1960s; 1970s; 1980s; 1990s
- See also: Other events of 1976; Timeline of Singaporean history

The following lists events that happened during 1976 in Singapore.

== Incumbents ==
- President: Benjamin Henry Sheares
- Prime Minister: Lee Kuan Yew

== Events ==
=== April ===
- 1 April – The Singapore Corporation of Rehabilitative Enterprises (SCORE) is formed to help ex-offenders find employment.

=== June ===
- June - The Pearl Bank Apartments is completed, making it Singapore's tallest and densest residential building in Singapore at that time. The Apartments will soon be demolished after being sold to CapitaLand in an en-bloc sale in 2018, which will be redeveloped into One Pearl Bank by 2023.

=== October ===
- 1 October -
  - The OCBC Centre is officially opened.
  - The Business Times is launched.

=== December ===
- 23 December – The PAP wins all 69 seats in the 1976 General Election.

=== Date unknown ===
- The Queensway Shopping Centre is opened as a sports mall. The mall also hosts Singapore's first public escalators.
- St James Power Station was decommissioned and its operations is taken over by Pasir Panjang and Jurong power stations.

== Births ==
- 20 January — Jamus Lim, Workers' Party Member of Parliament for Sengkang GRC.
- 21 January — Christopher de Souza, current Deputy Speaker of the Parliament of Singapore and PAP Member of Parliament for Holland-Bukit Timah GRC.
- 23 February — Aaron Aziz, actor and director.
- 20 April — Henry Kwek, PAP Member of Parliament for Kebun Baru SMC.
- 2 June — Yaw Shin Leong, former Workers' Party Member of Parliament for Hougang SMC (d. 2023).
- 24 June — Adam Chen, actor and host.
- 27 June — Intan Azura Mokhtar, former PAP Member of Parliament for Ang Mo Kio GRC.
- 14 July — Yeo Wan Ling, PAP Member of Parliament for Punggol GRC.
- 15 July — Desmond Lee, current Minister for Education.
- 2 August — Pritam Singh, 9th Leader of the Opposition and 9th Secretary-General of the Workers' Party.
- 26 August — Nick Shen, actor and host.
- 28 September — Yvonne Lim, actress.
- 2 December — Loretta Chen, theatre director and media personality.

== Deaths ==
- 25 January — Koo Young, former Barisan Sosialis legislative assemblyman for Thomson Constituency (b. 1936).
- 10 April — Sellappa Ramasamy, former PAP Member of Parliament for Bukit Merah Constituency and Potong Pasir Constituency (b. 1927).
- 4 October — Chua Boon Lay, footballer (b. 1902).
- 28 October — Chen Jen Hao, educator and pioneering artist (b. 1908).
- 15 December — P. S. Raman, diplomat (b. 1920).
