= South Seas Society (Singapore) =

Scholarly society in Singapore

- 南洋学会
- Formation: March 1940; 86 years ago
- Type: Scholarly society
- Purpose: Promotion of Southeast Asian studies
- Location: Singapore
- Website: www.southseassociety.sg
- Formerly called: China South Seas Society

The South Seas Society (Chinese: 南洋学会; pinyin: Nányáng Xúehuì) is a scholarly society in Singapore, which promotes research on Southeast Asia (Nanyang, lit. "South Seas"). The Society was founded in March 1940 as the China South Seas Society (Chinese: 中国南洋学会; pinyin: Zhōnggúo Nányáng Xúehuì). Its founders included Kwan Chu Poh (Chinese: 关楚璞), Yu Dafu (Chinese: 郁达夫), Yao Tse-Liang (Chinese: 姚楠), Hsu Yun Tsiao (Chinese: 许云樵), and other scholars and literary figures.

Former members of the Society's managing committee include: T. L. Yao, Huang Mun-se (Chinese: 黄曼士), Han Wai-toon (Chinese: 韩槐准), Lian Shih-sheng (Chinese: 连士升), and Gwee Yee-hean (Chinese: 魏维贤).

The founding of a Chinese society for Southeast Asian studies was unprecedented, as no such organisation or scholarly journal existed in the 1940s. The Society attracted scholars from around the world, including Britain, the US, Japan, China, Hong Kong, India, Indonesia, etc.

== Journal of the South Seas Society ==
The Society started the Journal of The South Seas Society (Chinese: 南洋学报; pinyin: Nányáng Xúebào) in 1940, to publish articles, notices, book reviews, etc. on Southeast Asian studies by scholars around the world, in both Chinese and English. Issues of the journal are currently published once a year by World Scientific.

Hsu Yun Ts'iao was the Journal's first editor-in-chief. His successors include Wang Gungwu (Chinese: 王赓武), Cheng Tsu-yu (Chinese: 郑子瑜), and Chen Songzhan (Chinese: 陈松沾).
