= 1968 in Singapore =

- Decades: 1940s; 1950s; 1960s; 1970s; 1980s
- See also: Other events of 1968; Timeline of Singaporean history

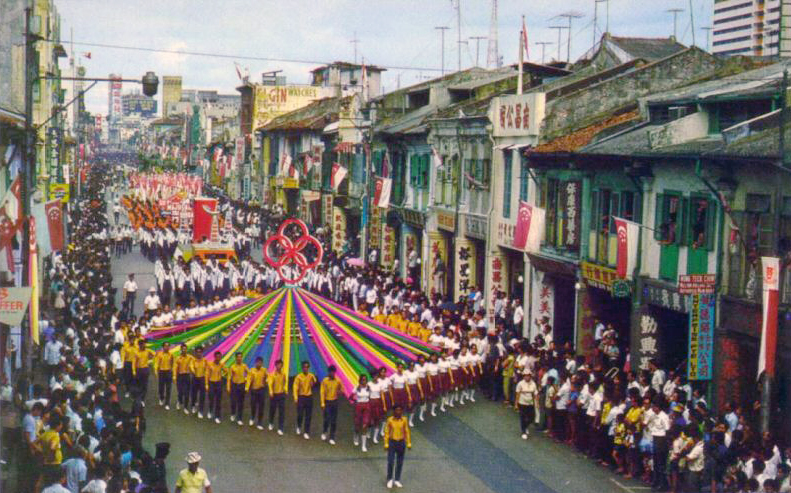

The following lists events that happened during 1968 in Singapore.

== Incumbents ==
- President: Yusof Ishak
- Prime Minister: Lee Kuan Yew

== Events ==
=== January ===
- 17 January – Britain announces its intention to withdraw its armed forces from Singapore by 1971.
- 30 January – The Ellenborough Market is destroyed in a fire, causing S$253,000 in damages and affecting about 1000 hawkers and stall-holders. The market is demolished a few years later.

=== April ===
- 13 April – The PAP wins the 1968 General Election.

=== May ===
- 1 May – The Hindu Endowments Board is formed.
- 23 May – Singapore Pools is formed as a state-owned lottery firm to combat triads and illegal syndicates.

=== June ===
- 1 June – Jurong Town Corporation is formed to develop Singapore's industries, taking over this role from the Economic Development Board.
- 7 June – Institute of Southeast Asian Studies (ISEAS) is established as a think-tank to research on trends and politics in Southeast Asia and beyond.

=== July ===
- 1 July – The Islamic Religious Council of Singapore (known as MUIS) is established.

=== September ===
- 1 September -
  - The Development Bank of Singapore (now DBS) commences operations.
  - Keppel Shipyard is established to take over PSA's ship-repair and shipbuilding services.
  - The Singapore Air Defence Command is formed.
- 17 September – The first A&W store opens at MSA Building, making it Singapore's first fast food restaurant. This went on until 2003, when A&W decided to leave Singapore. It made a return in 2019 to Jewel Changi Airport.

=== October ===
- 1 October – The Keep Singapore Clean campaign is launched.
- 17 October – The two marines were hanged for their roles in the MacDonald House bombing.

=== November ===
- 5 November – Intraco Ltd is formed to promote Singapore goods overseas.

=== December ===
- 17 December – Sembawang Shipyard was handed back to Singapore.
- 30 December – Neptune Orient Lines is formed as Singapore's national shipping line.

== Births ==
- 10 January – Zoe Tay, actress.
- 8 June – Teo Ser Luck, former politician.
- 16 June – Muhammad Faishal Ibrahim, politician.
- 8 July – Josephine Teo, Minister for Communications and Information.
- 14 July – Michael Palmer, 6th Speaker of the Parliament of Singapore.
- 8 August – Ng Chee Meng, Former Minister in Prime Minister's Office.
- 10 August – Kumar, comedian.
- 16 October – Mark Lee, comedian.
- 27 December – Lim Wee Kiak, politician and ophthalmologist.

=== Dates unknown ===
- Lau Siew Mei, writer.
- Benjamin Pwee, politician, business development strategist and consultant.

== Deaths ==
- 19 July – Emily Sadka, historian (b. 1920).
- 9 August – Lee Poh Neo, daughter of famous Straits Chinese businessman and philanthropist Lee Choon Guan (b. 1901).
- 8 September – Haji Hashim, founder of Singapore's first Malay bookshop, Haji Hashim Bookstore (b. 1900).
- 6 October – Goh Tong Liang, former Progressive Party legislative assemblyman for Bukit Panjang Constituency (b. 1894).
- 27 October – Sir George Oehlers, 1st Speaker of the Legislative Assembly of Singapore (b. 1908).
- 2 November – Richard Lim Chuan Hoe, barrister and former Deputy Speaker of the Legislative Assembly of Singapore (b. 1904).
- 7 November – A. J. Braga, 1st Minister for Health and former Labour Front legislative assemblyman for Katong Constituency (b. 1900).
- 6 December – Lim Keng Lian, tea merchant and Chinese community leader (b. 1893).
