= 1970 in Singapore =

- Decades: 1950s; 1960s; 1970s; 1980s; 1990s
- See also: Other events of 1970; Timeline of Singaporean history

The following lists events that happened during 1970 in Singapore.

== Incumbents ==
- President: Yusof Ishak (until 23 November), Yeoh Ghim Seng (Acting) (23 November to 2 January 1971)
- Prime Minister: Lee Kuan Yew

== Events ==
=== May ===
- 2 May – The Queenstown Branch Library (now Queenstown Community Library) is opened to the public, making it Singapore's first branch library.
- 14 May – The National Junior College opens as Singapore's first junior college. 6 to 8 more junior colleges are announced over the next few years as part of a new education plan, along with more ASEAN students and scholarships, a new hostel in Outram by September and the St John's School to be run by a trust.

=== July ===
- 8 July – Singapore's first kidney transplant is performed on 29-year-old Doreen Tan at the Outram Park General Hospital (present day Singapore General Hospital), led by Chan Kong Thoe. The operation is declared a success.

=== August ===
- 4 August – The Ministry of Health announced more hawker centres to be built within five years to resettle all street hawkers, resulting in greater hygiene and better facilities. For a start, three such hawker centres will be built this year.
- 11 August – The Ministry of Interior and Defence splits, forming the Ministry of Defence and Ministry of Home Affairs to better cater for defence and homeland security functions.

=== September ===
- September – Singapore is admitted into the Non-Aligned Movement.

=== October ===
- 1 October – The first shopping mall in Singapore, the People's Park Complex, is opened.

=== November ===
- 23 November – Singapore's first President Yusof Ishak dies while in office. Speaker of Parliament Yeoh Ghim Seng temporarily serves as acting president during that time.

== Births ==
- 2 May – Vincent Wijeysingha, Singapore Democratic Party politician.
- 22 June – Glenn Ong, radio DJ.
- 22 August – Gwee Li Sui, poet, graphic artist, critic.
- 27 August – Hazel Poa, former Progress Singapore Party NCMP of the 14th Parliament of Singapore.
- 31 August
  - Baey Yam Keng, current PAP Member of Parliament for Tampines GRC.
  - Dennis Tan, current Workers' Party Member of Parliament for Hougang SMC.
- 28 September – Leon Perera, former Workers' Party Member of Parliament for Aljunied GRC.
- 19 October – Darryl David, current PAP Member of Parliament for Ang Mo Kio GRC.
- 3 November – Steve Chia, 3rd Secretary-General of the Singapore People's Party and former NCMP of the 10th Parliament of Singapore.
- 10 November – Tay Ping Hui, actor and director.
- Lee Hong Chuang, current PAP Member of Parliament for Jurong East–Bukit Batok GRC.
- Dave Chua, author of Gone Case.
- Paul Tan, poet and winner of 1993 and 1997 Singapore Literature Prize.

== Deaths ==
- 1 January – Albert Lim Liat Juay, one of Singapore's most senior medical practitioners (b. 1890).
- 2 October – Han Wai Toon, scholar, collector and agriculturist (b. 1892).
- 23 November – Yusof bin Ishak, 1st President of Singapore (b. 1910).
