= 1979 in Singapore =

- Decades: 1950s; 1960s; 1970s; 1980s; 1990s
- See also: Other events of 1979; Timeline of Singaporean history

The following lists events that happened during 1979 in Singapore.

== Incumbents ==
- President: Benjamin Henry Sheares
- Prime Minister: Lee Kuan Yew

== Events ==
=== January ===
- 6 January – Prime Minister Lee Kuan Yew who was also Secretary-General of the PAP, announced that six PAP MPs will be stepping down to pave way for fresh talents. The six PAP MPs stepping down are namely Ng Yeow Chong of Mountbatten Constituency, Yong Nyuk Lin of Geylang West Constituency, Ahmad Haleem of Telok Blangah Constituency, Teong Eng Siong of Sembawang Constituency, Ivan Baptist of Potong Pasir Constituency and Ong Soo Chuan of Nee Soon Constituency.
- 11 January – The Singapore Refining Company is formed by three oil companies, namely Singapore Petroleum Company, Chevron and BP.
- 19 January – Three PAP MPs, namely Ahmad Haleem of Telok Blangah Constituency, Ivan Baptist of Potong Pasir Constituency and Ng Yeow Chong of Mountbatten Constituency submitted their resignation letters to Deputy Speaker Tang See Chim, effectively resigning from their seats in parliament.
- 24 January – The Singapore Symphony Orchestra is formed, playing its first concert.

=== February ===
- 10 February – By-elections are held in seven constituencies. This was the largest by-election by combined electorate to have ever taken place in post-independence Singapore.

=== April ===
- 1 April – The Vocational and Industrial Training Board is formed from a merger between the Industrial Training Board (ITB) and the Adult Education Board (AEB). The Board handles vocational and industrial training until the formation of Institute of Technical Education in 1992.
- 16 April – Plans for Raffles City, a future mixed-use development, are unveiled with a model shown to the public. The development will include a mall, an office block and 3 hotel towers; with one standing at about 200 metres high. Costing about S$600m, the development was targeted for completion in 1983, but it only opened in 1986.
- 20 April – Mitsukoshi Garden is officially opened in Jurong.
- 30 April – The government acquired land of the Kwong Wai Siew Peck San Teng Cemetery and plans to redeveloped it into the Bishan New Town.

=== June ===
- 1 June – The first National Courtesy Campaign is launched.
- 27 June – Sentosa Development Corporation announced a new monorail system that will replace double-decker buses, as well as a new 10-storey luxury hotel on Fort Siloso.

=== July ===
- 1 July – The four-digit postal code system takes effect, replacing the previous system used since 1950. The system, first announced on 25 April, will help in automating mail sorting processes.
- 30 July – The Ulu Pandan Incineration Plant is officially opened, making it Singapore's first incineration plant.

=== September ===
- 7 September – The first Speak Mandarin Campaign is launched to encourage Chinese Singaporeans to speak Mandarin instead of dialects.

=== October ===
- 15 October – The first automated teller machine (ATM) in Singapore is launched.
- 20 October – The first McDonald's outlet opened in Liat Towers.

=== Date unknown ===
- Singapore becomes the world's second busiest port in terms of shipping tonnage.

== Births ==
- 13 February – Jesseca Liu, actress.
- 2 May – Joscelin Yeo, former national swimmer.
- 26 June – Alaric Tay, actor.
- 28 June – Jeanette Aw, actress.
- 30 June – Rosanne Wong, former singer and 2R member.
- 10 July – Sun Xueling, politician.
- 25 November – Chua En Lai, actor.
- 25 December – Celest Chong, actress and former singer.

== Deaths ==
- 6 January – Yap Pheng Geck, prominent banker, businessman, civic leader and former Singapore Alliance Party candidate for River Valley Constituency in the 1963 General Election (b. 1901).
- 6 March – Wee Swee Hong, former Liberal Socialist Party city councillor for Aljunied Constituency (b. 1897).
- 23 April – Lin Wo Chiang, former President of the Tagore Society and lecturer at the Department of Political Science in Nanyang University (b. 1890).
- 27 April – Shariff Dol, film actor (b. 1926).
- 13 August – Hassan Ali Jivabhai, former city councillor for City Constituency (b. 1910).
- 2 September – Checha Davies, social worker and women's rights activist (b. 1898).
- 3 September – Lim Cheng Hoe, pioneering watercolourist (b. 1912).
- 2 November – Jah Lelawati, Bangsawan actress and writer (b. 1937).
- 2 December – Low Guan Onn, joint managing director of Jurong Shipyard and former PAP Member of Parliament for River Valley Constituency (b. 1915).
