= Hsu Yun Tsiao =

- 許雲樵
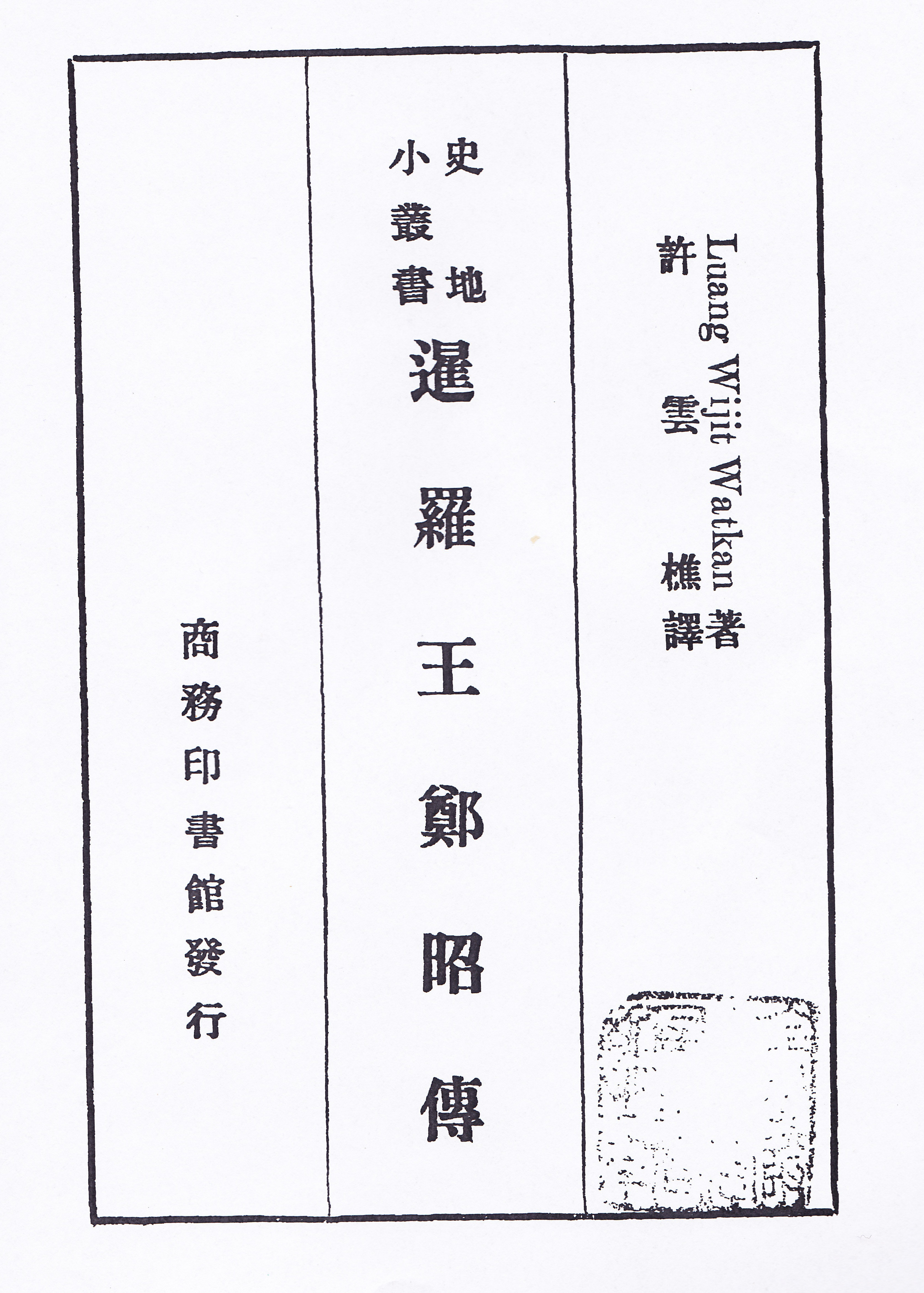
- Born: Xu Yu (許鈺); 1905; Jiangsu Province, Qing China
- Died: November 17, 1981 (aged 75–76); Singapore
- Other names: Mengfei (梦飞), 希夷室主
- Occupation: Historian
- Known for: History of Southeast Asia; Chinese Overseas

Hsu Yun Tsiao (Chinese: 許雲樵; pinyin: Xǔ Yúnqiáo; birth name Chinese: 許鈺; pinyin: Xǔ Yù; 1905 – 17 November 1981) was a scholar of Overseas Chinese and Southeast Asian history.

Hsu was born in 1905 in Jiangsu Province, China. He was raised by his maternal grandparents after the death of his parents. In 1931, he migrated to Singapore. He taught in Chinese schools in Johor and contributed to newspapers like the Nanyang Siang Pau. Between 1933 and 1938, he taught in Thailand, where he met his wife (née Liu). He taught at Nanyang University from 1957 to 1961. Between 1963 and 1971, he worked at the Southeast Asian Research Centre (新加坡东南亚硏究所), and was the editor of its Journal of Southeast Asian Researches (《东南亚硏究》), which published seven volumes between 1965 and 1971. He later taught at Ngee Ann College (today's Ngee Ann Polytechnic) between 1973 and 1976.

In addition to his teaching and editorial work, Hsu was noted for translating Malay and Thai texts, such as the Sejarah Melayu (Malay Annals), into Chinese. He was a founding member of the South Seas Society in 1940, and was the first editor-in-chief of the society's Journal.

Hsu died of a heart attack at a nursing home in Singapore on 17 November 1981. He was survived by his wife, three daughters, and seven sons.

== Library ==
Before his death, Hsu offered to sell his collection of 30,000 books to the Malaysian Chinese Association for $150,000, as the books were reportedly declined by institutions in Singapore. He intended to use the money to fund a trip to China. To keep the collection in Singapore, a Singaporean businessman, Kho Bak Weng, formed a company to buy the books from Hsu and set up a private library. The library was eventually transferred to the Singapore Federation of Chinese Clan Associations, which donated it to the National Library of Singapore in 2014.
