= 1978 Singapore flood =

1978 flood in Singapore

- Date: 3 December 1978
- Location: Singapore
- Cause: Heavy rainfall
- Deaths: 7
- Property damage: S$10 million

The 1978 Singapore flood was one of the worst floods in Singapore's history. As much as 512 millimetres (20.2 in) of rain fell in just 24 hours from 2 to 3 December 1978.

== Casualties ==
Seven people were killed and more than a thousand residents were evacuated from their homes by the army and police boats from four affected areas. The youngest death was a 10-year-old primary school boy who had fallen into a flooded drain.

== Damage ==
Total damage reached S$10 million, the worst flood since the Hari Raya floods that hit the island in December 1969. 43 buses were badly damaged by the flood.

There were reportedly 200 pig carcasses located in the Kallang River.
