= Lien Shih Sheng =

Writer and news editor in Singapore

Lien Shih Sheng (Chinese: 连士升; 24 May 1907 – 9 July 1973), better known by his penname Ziyun, was a pioneer writer and news editor in Singapore.

== Early life and education ==
Lien was born in Fu'an, Fujian on 24 May 1907. He first received his education from his father, who was a teacher. At the age of seven, he was enrolled in the school where his father was teaching. However, his father died a year later, and he transferred to another school. After graduating, he began attending a private academy in Fu'an. Following his mother's death, he began attending schools in Xiapu and Fuzhou. He then began attending Yenching University in Beijing, where he majored in economics. After graduating in 1931, he continued to attend the university as a graduate student.

== Career ==
While in Beijing, Lien began writing for various publications, including Shen Bao. He served as the editor of several publications, including The Chinese Historical Geography Semi-monthly Magazine. He founded Knowledge for the Public with his friend and teacher, folklorist and historian Gu Jiegang. Following the start of the Second Sino-Japanese War in 1937, he left for Hong Kong, where he was employed at various news agencies. He also served as a professor at Lingnan University. In 1942, he left Hong Kong for Trà Vinh, Vietnam, where he was appointed the principal of a Chinese school. While there, he translated a few books on the economic history of France, Germany and England.

Following the end of the war in 1945, he left Vietnam for Nanjing. However, he soon returned to Vietnam due to the high inflation rates in Nanjing. He and his family left for Singapore in 1947, where he became the lead writer of the Chung Nam Daily. In the following year, he was employed at the Nanyang Siang Pau as a correspondent and left for Europe. In the same year, he wrote A trip to my motherland, which recounted his return to China. In 1958, the newspaper began publishing Letters From the Coast, an eight-volume series which was a compilation of letters he had written under the pen name "Ziyun". The book would later become his best known work. In the following year, he was appointed a member of the Public Service Commission, and his biography of Jawaharlal Nehru was published. In 1961, his biography of Rabindranath Tagore was published. In 1963, he was awarded the Meritorious Public Service Award. From 1964 to 1969, he served as the president of the South Seas Society. He left the Public Service Commission in 1966. In 1968, his biography of Mahatma Gandhi was published. In the following year, he became the chief editor of the Nanyang Siang Pau. He retired from this position on 1 October 1971.

He was a member of the Nanyang University Founding Committee and the vice-president of the China Society of Singapore. He had published over twenty books on his travels and his letters.

== Personal life and death ==
Lien married twice and had one son and five daughters. In 1973, he went on a three-month visit to China. Upon returning to Singapore, he fell ill due to anemia and fatigue from the trip. He died on 9 July 1973, two weeks after he had returned.
