= East Coast Park =

Beach park on the eastern coast of Singapore

East Coast Park (ECP)
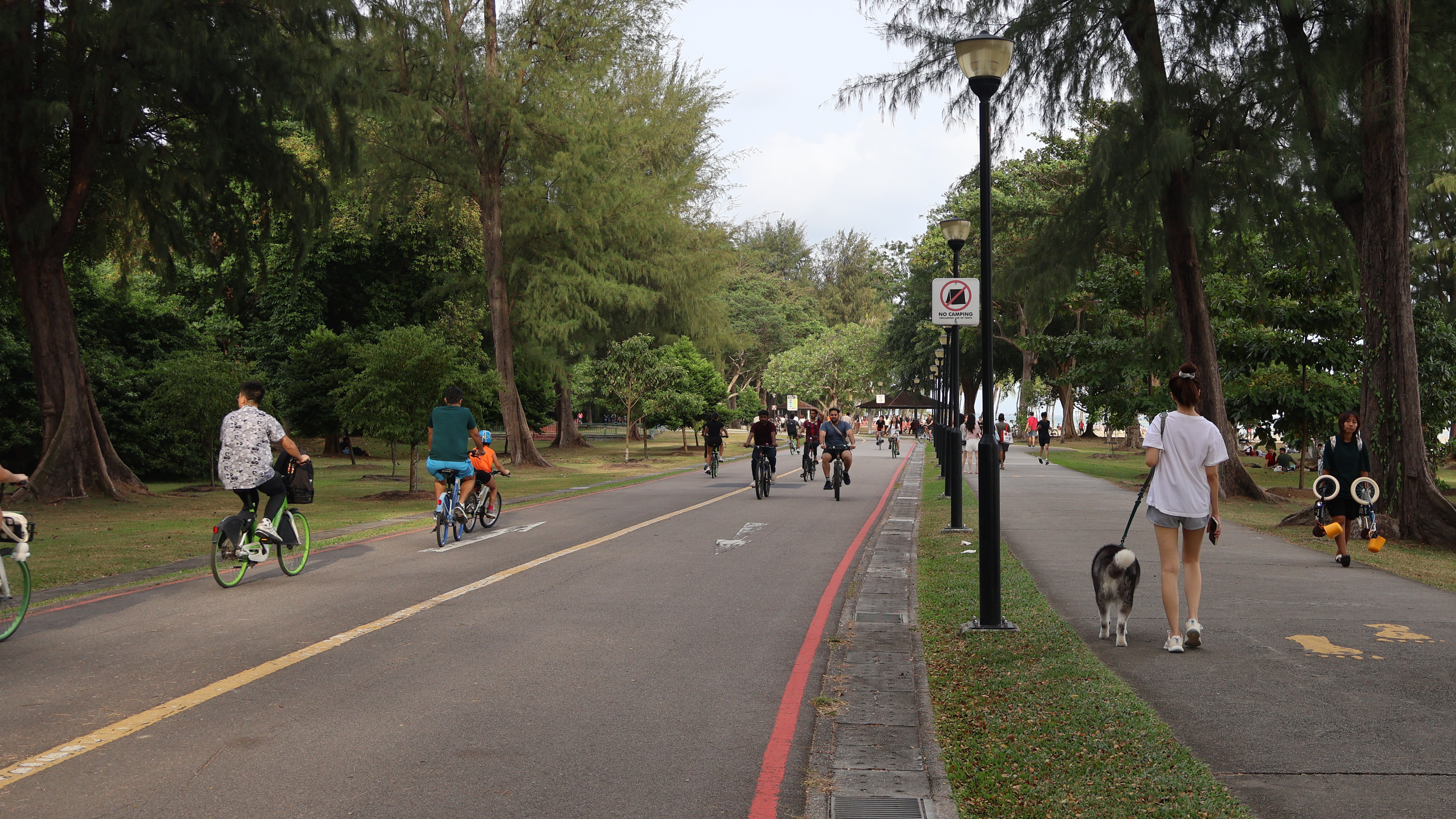
- East Coast Park in 2026
- Interactive map of East Coast Park (ECP)
- Location: Southeastern coast of Singapore
- Coordinates: 1.303956°N 103.926373°E
- Area: 185 hectares (460 acres)
- Manager: National Parks Board

East Coast Park (ECP) is a beach and a park on the southeastern coast of Singapore. It stretches along the south of Marine Parade, Bedok, and Tampines. It was opened in the 1970s, after the Singapore government had completed reclaiming land off the coast at Katong, from Kallang to Changi. Themed "Recreation for All", it not only serves the needs of communities in the east, other Singapore residents do also visit the park for sports, recreation, and food.

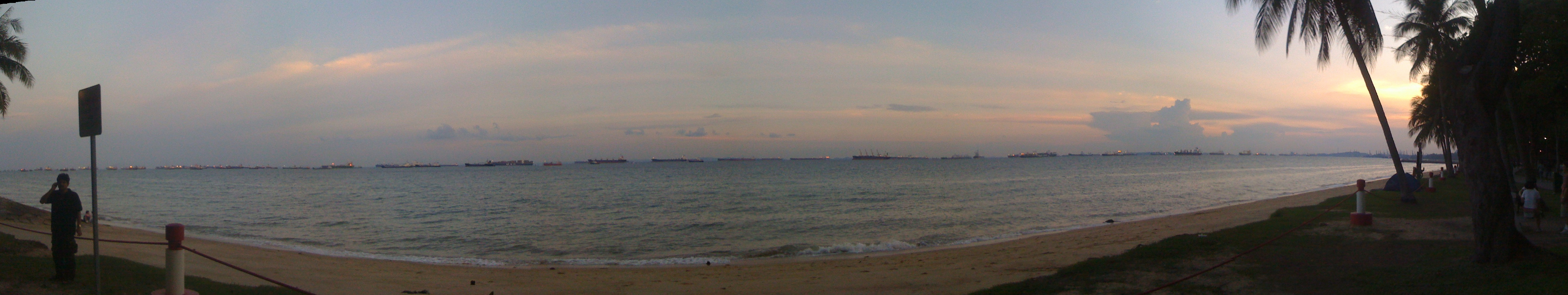
Sea Coast off East Coast Park

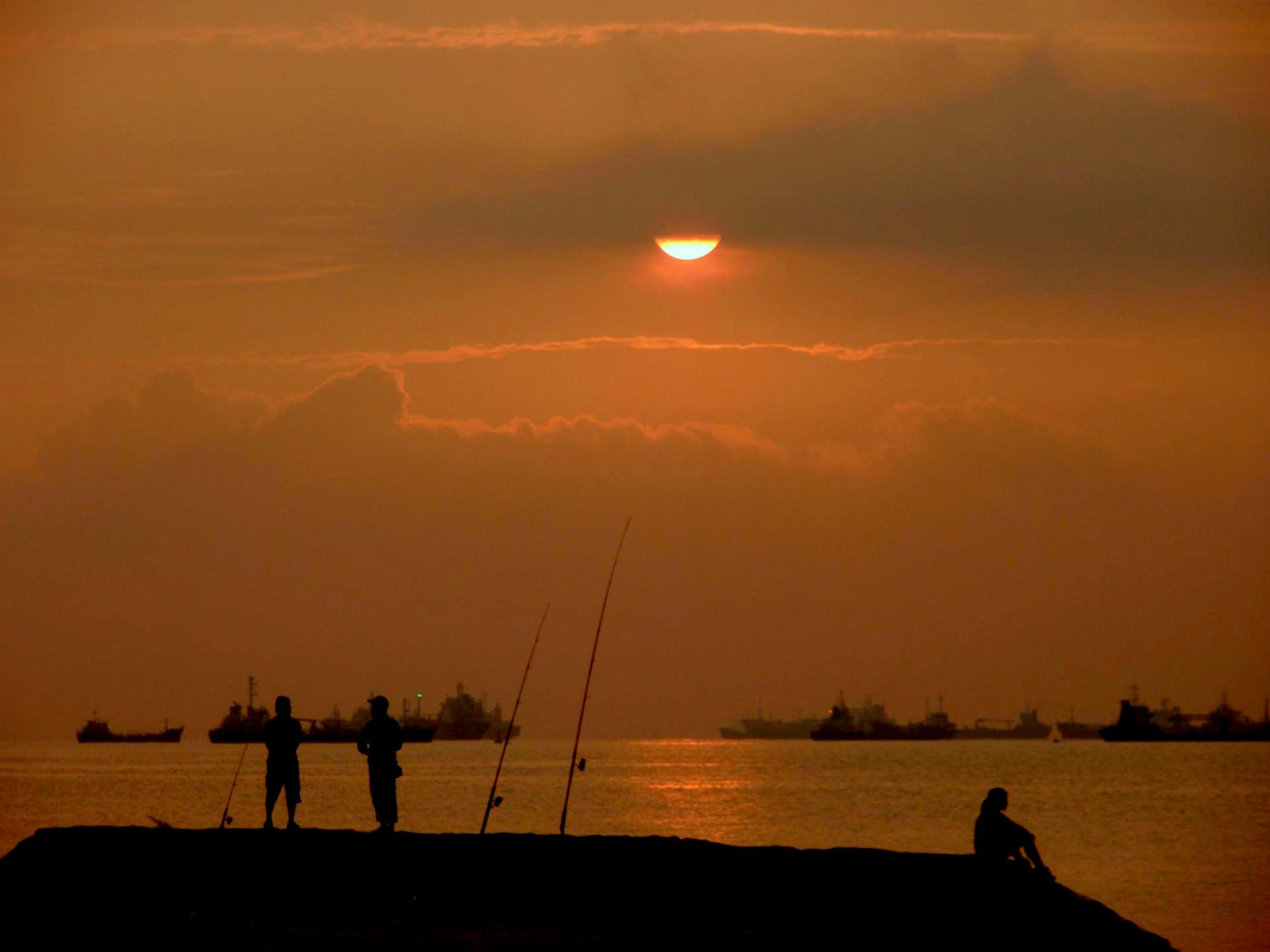
Sunrise at East Coast Park, Singapore

The 185-hectare (460-acre) East Coast Park is the largest park in Singapore, and is built entirely on reclaimed land with a man-made beach, where swimming is possible. The beach is protected by breakwaters.

The park has barbecue pits, chalets, food centres and amenities for various sports activities. Visitors can fish at Bedok Jetty (Area F). A cycling and inline skating track runs along the perimeter of the park, which measures over 15 km (9.3 mi) long. It is connected to Changi Beach Park by the Coastal Park Connector, the longest of Singapore's park connectors at 15 km (9.3 mi).

== Description ==
With an area of 185 ha (460 acres), East Coast Park is Singapore's largest. It is bounded by the East Coast Parkway to the north and has 15 km (9.3 miles) of coastline. The park is also the most visited park in Singapore, with 7.5 million visitors annually.

East Coast Park is divided into eight areas, labeled A to H from west to east. Of these, those at the park's edges, areas A, G, and H, tend to be less crowded, while the main facilities and attractions are located in the more popular areas, from B to F.

== History ==
=== Initial plans and development ===
East Coast Park was first proposed as part of plans for the utilisation of land reclaimed as part of the East Coast Reclamation Project. Initial plans for the park included a 9-acre (3.6 ha) swimming lagoon, areas for camping and picnicking, and outdoor sports facilities such as tennis courts. Development work commenced in the middle of 1971, and the park, although still under development, was opened to the public in October 1972, to alleviate some of the pressure on the Changi and Tanah Merah beaches on weekends and public holidays. Construction on a $12 million, 350-acre (140 ha) seaside holiday resort began in September 1974 and a dedicated cycling track was opened for public use at the end of that year.

The S$4 million swimming lagoon was opened in May 1976, along with refreshment and sanitation facilities. Upon its opening, the lagoon immediately became popular with swimmers and picnickers, with over 70,000 people visiting in the first week. To provide access between the park and nearby areas, six underpasses were constructed at a cost of S$1 million.

In January 1977, plans to build a 2.8 ha (6.9-acre) aquatic centre to complement the lagoon were announced. The Singapore Tennis Centre, located in the park, was opened in March that year. Plans for a 1200-seat food centre near the lagoon were announced in April, and the first batch of the Housing and Urban Development Company's (HUDC) chalets were opened in May, with the rest following soon after. Plans for a seafood centre in the park, with five seafood restaurants from Upper East Coast Road, were also announced that year.

The $6 million aquatic centre, named 'Big Splash', was opened in July 1977. It featured an 85-metre-long (279 ft) slide, which was claimed to be the world's longest and highest, and an artificial wave pool, as well as food outlets. Nevertheless, the aquatic centre suffered from poor business and low patronage, and cost $2 million a year to operate. As a result, the original operator sold it to the Singapore Industrial Business Organisation (SILO) for $4.3 million the following year.

In August 1978, the Parkland Golf Driving Range, the first one in Singapore, opened its doors in the park. Due to high demand for the chalets, the Urban Redevelopment Authority constructed 59 additional two-storey chalets, twice as large as the previous ones, for the HUDC in 1979. Costing $2.5 million, the chalets were opened in April 1981.

=== The 1980s and 1990s ===
In 1980, as part of the government's desire to inculcate a sense of courtesy among road users, a 4-hectare (9.9-acre), $1 million traffic games park for children, operated by the Traffic Police, was built. A sailing school was opened by the Singapore Sports Council off the lagoon in May that year. The cycling track was also extended from the lagoon to Changi Point and the entire East Coast area was landscaped as parkland over two years beginning in 1981, to cope with the large number of users. The East Coast Recreation Centre, built at a cost of $3.5 million, opened in 1982, with restaurants, a computer library, sports facilities, and a remote-control car track. During this period, the park also had insufficient parking spaces to cope with demand, resulting in widespread illegal parking in the more popular areas. Hence, more parking spaces were built, and the government put in place parking fees to encourage motorists to use other, less utilised carparks. To facilitate crime prevention and public outreach, a police post was opened in the park in October 1982.

Construction of what was stated to be one end of the park, a 1.2 km (0.75 mi) stretch between Bedok Canal and the Tanah Merah Golf Club, began in 1983. In February 1985, plans to extend the park by 17 ha (42 acres) to the Bedok Canal were announced, along with additional facilities to be built within that area. In October of that year, the $5.4 million East Coast Parkway Seafood Centre opened for business with six restaurants, with brisk business in the first few weeks of operation. To improve access to the park, and as a result of feedback from road users, the one-way service road was converted to two-way traffic in 1986. In the same year, the children's lagoon was closed due to low patronage and was filled in. A water slide was installed at the lagoon to attract more users, to little effect.

To reduce confusion, the naming system for the areas in the park was changed in 1987 with the areas being named, from A to G, from west to east. By the late 1980s, the chalets at the park had become frequently utilised for vice and other questionable activities. To prevent the chalets from being used as such, in March 1990, the UDMC, which operated the chalets, limited bookings to a maximum of two chalets. In May 1990, in light of similar violations across Singapore, the eight restaurants at the seafood centre were fined, and two suspended, for poor hygiene and for breaking several health laws.

Littering was also rampant within the park, with The Straits Times claiming that it had the most litter of all the parks in Singapore in 1990. In November 1990, a skateboard park was opened at Big Splash. The park was also the first area which litterbugs cleaned up when given a Corrective Work Order (CWO) under a new law, implemented in 1992. The park had also been facing considerable soil erosion, with two to seven per cent of jogging and cycling paths relocated as of 1993. Nevertheless, the Parks and Recreation Department stated that the soil would stabilise. In November 1992, Sun Corporation announced plans to develop a $40 million leisure and recreation park at the lagoon. The development was handed over to Unicentral in 1993, but by 1994, the plan had run into trouble, with building plans still not approved.

Plans for E-zone, a $50 million theme park at the East Coast Recreation Centre, were announced in July 1995. To accommodate E-zone, the East Coast Recreation Centre underwent a significant revamp in 1996. The lagoon was turned into a fish and crab-catching area, which opened in November 1996. In April 1997, camping permits were made available to the public, with camping permitted at three designated camp sites within the park.

=== The 2000s and onward ===
By the start of the 2000s, the park's popularity had waned considerably from its heyday in the 1970s and 80s. To rejuvenate the park, major upgrading plans were put in place in 2003. These included expanding the park by 11 ha (27 acres), connecting it with Marina South, renovation of the food centre, and introducing more food and beverage outlets. A mini-golf range, Lilliputt, was also opened that year. To cope with increasing demand, more facilities were added to the park in the following years. These included the 1.5 ha (3.7-acre) Bougainvillea Garden and the $2 million Cable Ski Park Ski360 which was located at the East Coast Lagoon. Moreover, in November 2005, a $160 million revamp of the park was announced. In 2008, after a $6 million revamp, the Big Splash water park was reopened as Playground @ Big Splash, which was marketed as a 'lifestyle destination'. Camping within the park also gained popularity at this time, with 12,000 campers as of 2008. NParks implemented a stricter permit-to-camp system as a result.

In 2012, Marine Cove was closed for redevelopment. That same year, the National Parks Board (NParks) announced plans to connect the park with the Bay East Garden, with completion by 2014. This was done to improve safety for cyclists and to improve access. After eight years, the Ski360 cable ski park closed in November 2014. Additional closures followed, with several restaurants at the East Coast Seafood Centre making way for a lawn in 2015, and Raintree Cove, consisting of 10 establishments, closing in 2017.

New facilities were opened at the sites of closed attractions, with Parkland Green, a development with retail outlets and a lawn for picnickers, opening in 2014 at the former location of Parkland Golf Driving Range. After a two-year redevelopment, Marine Cove was reopened in 2016, with NParks touting its facilities as family-friendly. Marine Cove then became the most popular in the park, attracting large crowds. With concerns over overcrowding at Marine Cove, NParks announced redevelopment plans at the former Raintree Cove, Goldkist Chalets and Big Splash sites, meant to spread out park patrons throughout more areas of the park. Raintree Cove became an area for leisure activities, and in November 2019, Cyclist Park, with two cycling circuits, retail outlets, and other facilities intended for cyclists, was opened. Redevelopment works in the park were completed with the opening of Coastal PlayGrove, a recreational area for adolescents, on the former Big Splash site in March 2021, while plans for additional facilities, such as a nature trail and a wellness garden, were announced that year.

In March 2026, the Urban Redevelopment Authority said the Government was planning to begin preparatory works for the Long Island project, including the removal of seabed obstructions and the movement of materials into waters off East Coast Park. On 30 June 2026, URA and HDB announced that preparatory works for the Long Island reclamation project would begin off East Coast Park from the end of 2026. A second phase, covering about 155 hectares east of Bedok Jetty, is planned to begin after major international sporting events hosted by Singapore, including the 2029 SEA Games.

== Facilities ==
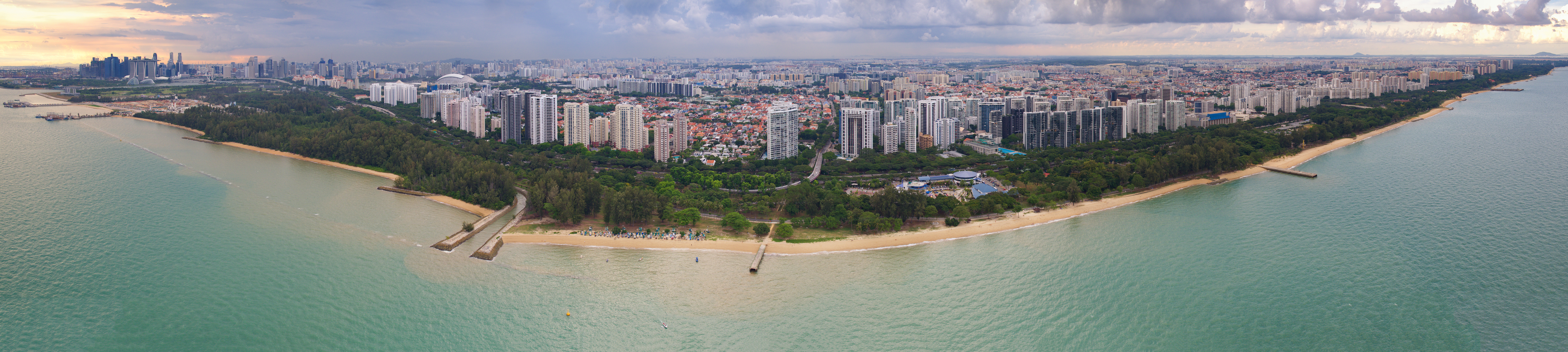
East Coast Park

=== National Sailing Centre ===
The National Sailing Centre, run by the Singapore Sailing Federation, conducts activities such as sailing and wind surfing.

=== East Coast Lagoon Food Centre ===
The East Coast Lagoon Food Centre is a hawker centre near the East Coast Lagoon.

Occupying 0.81-hectare (2.0-acre), the centre was constructed by the Public Works Department in 1977 at a cost of $700,000, with seating for 1,200 and 60 stalls. Constructed of wood, the centre consisted of ten structures, with butterfly-shaped roofs for the cooking areas and pyramid-shaped ones for the eating areas; its design was intended to blend in with the seaside and the lagoon.

In 2003, as part of a redevelopment plan for the park, the hawker centre received an upgrade. In late 2013, it was upgraded at a cost of $1.5 million. As part of the upgrade, the toilets were renovated and the seating capacity increased. Roofing and wooden floors were also installed.

=== East Coast Seafood Centre ===
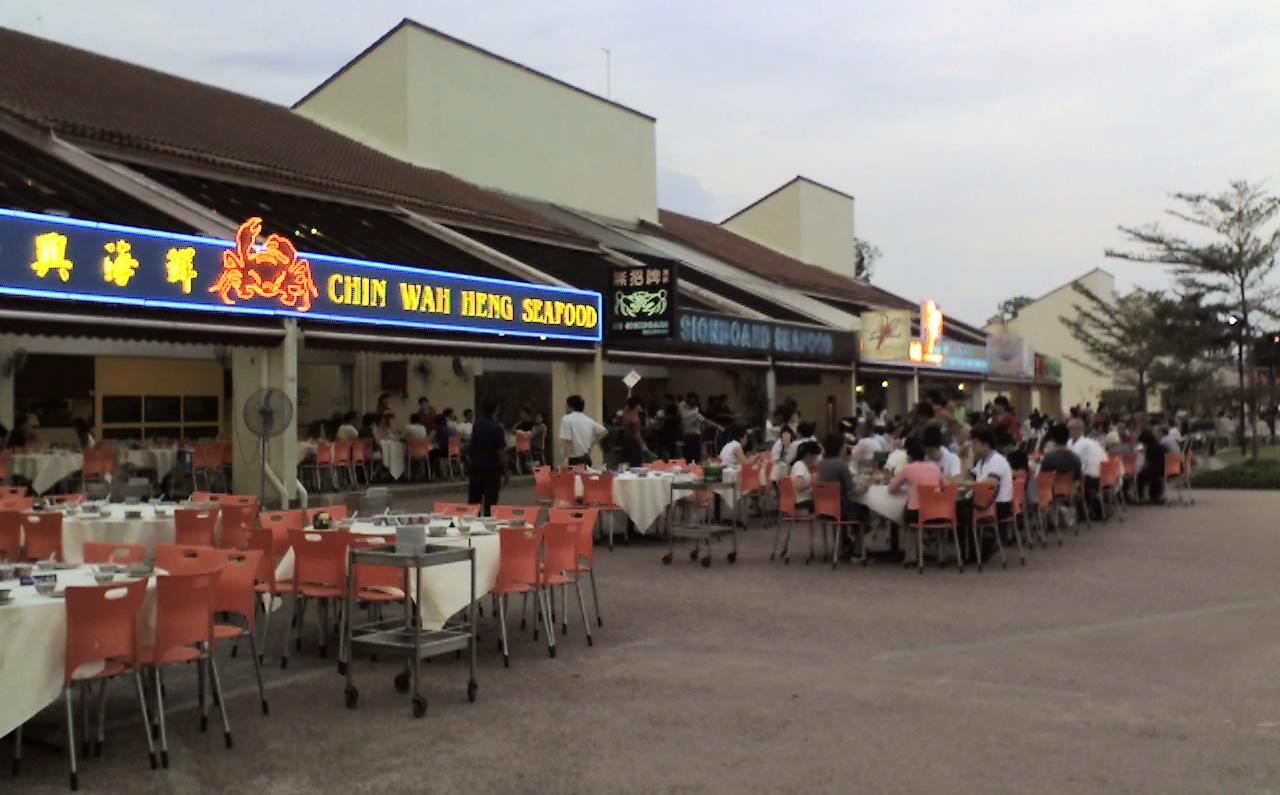
East Coast Seafood Centre

The East Coast Seafood Centre was opened at the same time as the East Coast Park, with eight restaurants serving seafood. Its original name was UDMC Seafood Centre, which was later changed in 2000 to its current name. In 2005, the Seafood Centre was upgraded to give it a modernised look.

Plans for the seafood centre were first announced in July 1977, with five seafood restaurants from Upper East Coast Road. The owners of the restaurants were initially unhappy with the offer to move, citing reduced seating and patronage at the new site. In response, the Ministry of National Development claimed that with the offer, they were helping them by allowing them to continue business permanently, since the restaurants were then operating on a temporary basis.

In September 1980, revised plans for the seafood centre were announced, with room for eight seafood restaurants located near the lagoon. Eventually, the seafood centre, with space for eight restaurants, was constructed near the swimming lagoon due to frequent complaints by residents in the Upper East Coast Road area over illegal parking by restaurant customers, at a cost of $5 million. Tenders for the restaurants were called in February 1985.

After renovations, the first six restaurants at the seafood centre opened for business in October 1985. For these restaurants, the business was generally better than at their old premises, with restaurant owners noting increased takings, and their patrons were also satisfied with the new location. However, there was also much unhappiness among restaurant owners and customers over the inconvenience of the seafood centre. In 1990, renovations were carried out at the restaurants. That same year, all the restaurants at the centre were fined, while two, Golden Lagoon and Jumbo, were suspended for two weeks for violations of health regulations, such as poor hygiene practices. Nevertheless, business did not seem to be affected, with a Straits Times reporter noting that they still drew large crowds in the evening.

Through the rest of the 1980s and 1990s, the restaurants at the centre generally did well, and many tourists patronised them. However, by 2015, customer numbers had decreased considerably, with those at Red House Seafood falling by 35 per cent in the previous two years. In March 2015, Red House Seafood closed, with a landscaped lawn taking its place, and with their leases having expired, two other restaurants, No Signboard Seafood and Fisherman's Village, also closed.

=== Marine Cove ===
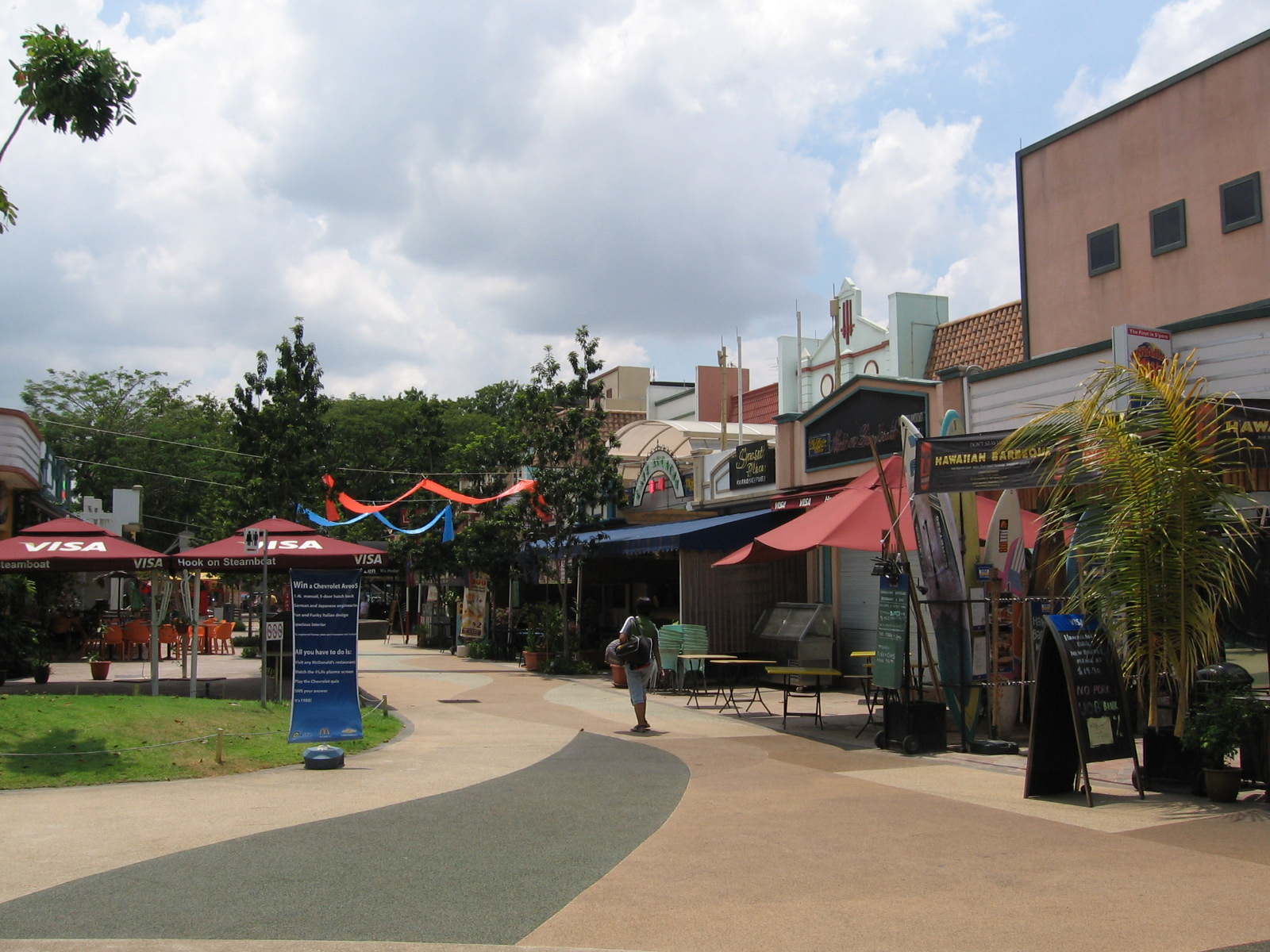
Marine Cove

Marine Cove (formerly known as the East Coast Recreation Centre), is a building complex in Area C at East Coast Park.

Construction of the East Coast Recreation Centre began in April 1980, and it was completed in early 1982 at a cost of $3.5 million. Touted by its developer to have something for each member of the family, it featured a computer library offering computer classes, a music school, an amusement room with video games, restaurants and sports facilities. Because of insufficient available parking spaces, an additional car park was initially opened on a grass verge; a permanent car park was eventually built.

In 1996, as part of the new E-zone theme park, the complex underwent an eight-month renovation in 1996. Among the changes were the construction of a room and a building to house Sega gaming machines.

The location was sold to Rock Productions, New Creation Church's business arm, in 2002, and it was subsequently renamed Marine Cove. During this time, many cafés, restaurants, and bars were located along the stretch. It also had a small commemorative fountain in the middle of the pedestrian walkway in its premises. It featured a McDonald's restaurant with a drive-thru and a "skate-thru" counter. It also used to have a bowling alley and a billiards saloon.

With the land handed back to NParks in 2011, the area was closed on 18 March 2012 for the area's redevelopment. The new Marine Cove featuring a greater variety of dining options and a 3,500 m^{2} (38,000 sq ft) children's playground at the redeveloped facility, reopened on 28 June 2016.

=== Raintree Cove ===
Raintree Cove was once an establishment in Area C which once housed Long Beach seafood restaurant, Korean barbecue restaurant and a tuition Center and arcade on the second floor. Facing the seafront had a bar, a bicycle rental kiosk and an ice cream kiosk. Within the grounds also featured a Tennis Centre with an indoor Futsal court. Due to its lease expiry, it was closed in 2017 for redevelopment. It was reopened in 2019 as an outdoor refreshment lounge area with greenery featuring swings and an open lawn.

=== Coastal Playgrove ===
Formerly known as Big Splash, the sports facility that once home to a Singapore's first themed indoor mini golf course and a water play slide had been redeveloped into an outdoor play area with dining options surrounding the facility.

=== Parkland Green ===
Parkland Green is a 4-hectare (9.9-acre) cluster of restaurants, cafes and consists of an open lawn for activities. The building facility is situated next to Carpark C1.

Parkland Green opened in September 2014 and is also a popular spot for pet lovers especially on weekends.

=== Bedok Jetty ===
Bedok Jetty is the longest fishing jetty—250 m (820 ft)—in Singapore. It is located in Area F of East Coast Park.

It is the most popular jetty for fishing in Singapore, but it is also frequented by cyclists, rollerbladers, joggers or park visitors since it is part of the East Coast Park.

Bedok Jetty was originally built by a local businessman Mr Yap Swee Hong at a cost of $1.5 million in 1966. He did this to facilitate the importation of scrap metal from the Americans who were engaged in the Vietnam war at the time. It was built in the reclaimed land of East Coast under the East Coast reclamation. It was used by the Singapore Armed Forces in 1975 to receive the refugees after the surrender of Saigon to the North Vietnamese forces. An SAF Field Hospital was deployed to Bedok Jetty to provide first aid and other essential medical services to all Singapore bound refugee boats fleeing South Vietnam following the fall of Saigon in 1975.

In the 1980s, the jetty became popular among fishing enthusiasts. However, by 1988, it was in a poor state, with The Straits Times noting its corroded railings and cracked support beams. In March that year, the Public Works Department closed the jetty for a $1.1 million facelift, consisting of repairs to the jetty's deck and supports.

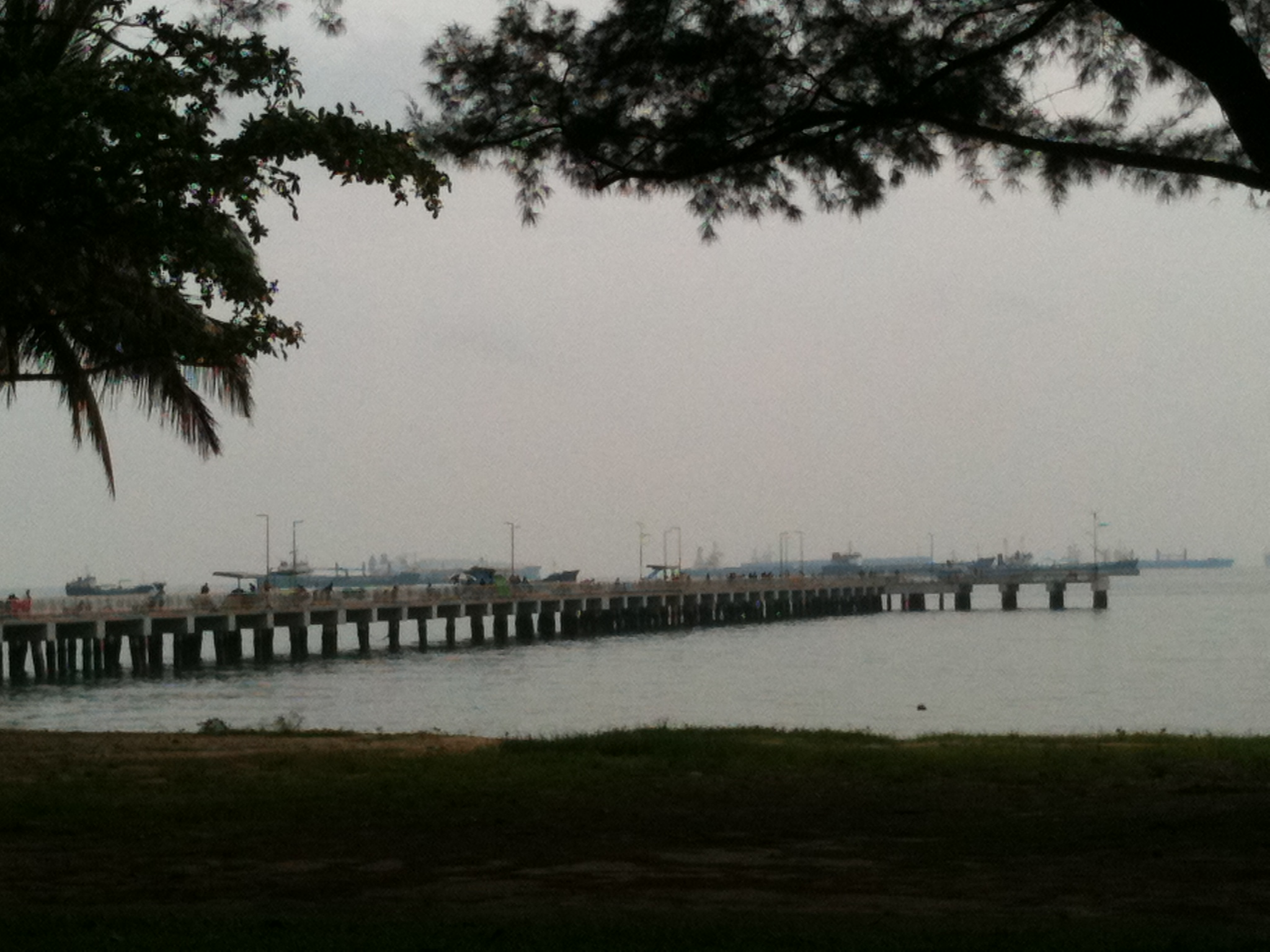
View of Bedok Jetty from East Coast Park

=== Siglap Canal ===
Located near Area C4, a new lawn and lookout deck in the East Coast Park was opened to provide visitors with an additional area for recreational activities as well as a community space. These enhancements were carried out that included drainage upgrading for a 230 m (750 ft) section of the Siglap Canal to the sea.

=== Mana Mana Beach Club ===
The Mana Mana Beach Club, located at the park since 1994, comprises a restaurant, storage facilities for sailing, windsurfing, snorkelling and kayaking equipment and boats. It also has one indoors function room and one outdoor function area which is available for rent to hold parties and events.

== Transportation ==
The park is accessible by East Coast Park Service Road with numerous exits along the East Coast Parkway. Ample parking space is provided with many carparks situated in various locations in the park. SBS Transit Bus Service 401 stops along the East Coast Park Service Road from Bedok Bus Interchange during weekends and public holidays. Underpasses below the East Coast Parkway link the park (from Areas B to G) to nearby housing estates. The Thomson East Coast (MRT) Line also has access to the park by Marine Parade and Bayshore MRT Station.

The park is also connected to other parks in Singapore through the Park Connector Network, being part of the Eastern Coastal Park Connector Network. Within the park, footpaths and cycling paths allow access to pedestrians and cyclists respectively.

== See also ==
- Park Connector Network contiguous to East Coast Park
  - Pasir Ris Beach Park, to northeast of East Coast Park
  - Changi Beach Park, to east of East Coast Park
  - Gardens by the Bay - East, to west of East Coast Park
- List of parks in Singapore
- Beach management
- Coastal management, for creation and maintenance of beach
