= Daniel Ong =

Singaporean businessman and actor

- Born: Daniel Ong Ming Yu; 27 December 1975 (age 50); Singapore
- Occupations: Businessman, radio DJ, television host
- Spouses: unnamed (m. 1998; div. 1998) Jaime Teo (m. 2007; div. 2016) Fay Tan (m. 2020)
- Children: 3

Daniel Ong Ming Yu (Chinese: 王盟友; born 27 December 1975) is a Singaporean businessman, radio DJ and television host. He is the co-founder of Twelve Cupcakes, a Singapore-based cupcake chain. He also entered the eateries business with Mischief American street food at Esplanade in 2015, and Rookery at Hong Leong building in 2014. He was a radio deejay in Singapore's MediaCorp Radio 987FM and television host.

== Media career ==
Ong is known for his role in Singapore's television sitcom Mr. Kiasu as Kiasee, as well as co-hosting the second season of Singapore Idol in 2006.

Ong joined 987FM since 1999.

Ong hosted the Dan and Young show on 987FM on weekdays, 5am to 10am with Mr Young (Young Leong). In 2004, Ong was suspended from on-air duties after making ‘lewd’ jokes that aired on Perfect 10 radio station. He also hosted National Day Parade 2006 and other events.

Ong managed the station for 15 months and then stepped down due to the long working hours of juggling the morning show with managerial duties.

In January 2010, Ong resigned his full time position from 987FM and worked as a part time position to spend time with his family. In September, he joined One FM 91.3.

In 2011, Ong briefly hosted "The Wrong Way Home" on One FM 91.3.

== Business career ==
In 2011, Ong and Jaime Teo started Twelve Cupcakes. The first outlet of Twelve Cupcakes was opened at United Square Shopping Mall, in Novena. In January 2017, after the divorce of Daniel Ong and Jaime Teo in late 2016, the chain was sold to Dhunseri Group, an Indian tea company, which acquired it for S$2.5 million.

In 2015, Ong started the Rookery Group, which has three Rookery outlets at Capital Tower, Hong Leong Building and China Square. Due to the COVID-19 pandemic in Singapore, all three outlets closed in 2020.

In 2015, Ong, alongside Cynthia Koh and Michelle Chong, opened Mischief, a restaurant serving American street food and alcohol, at the Esplanade Mall. Mischief closed in early 2024.

In 2017, Ong with Allan Wu started a Cambodia-brewed craft beer line, Brewlander.

In 2020, Ong faced 24 charges under the Employment of Foreign Manpower Act connected to Twelve Cupcakes. Ong was charged with underpaying eight of its foreign employees from 2012 to 2016. Ong pleaded guilty to 10 charges and was fined S$65,000 in May 2021.

In 2020, Ong started Dan’s Steaks as a home-based business and expanded to a commercial kitchen. In 2021, Ong expanded Dan’s Steaks to a restaurant in Serangoon Garden. The restaurant further expanded to outlets at Upper East Coast Road, Greenwood Avenue and The Star Vista, but all Dan's Steaks closed by late 2026.

Ong also operated an art school, Artfully Yours, at Ang Mo Kio, as a replacement company for his wife's, Fay Tan, former home based art school, Art Chamber.

In 2022, Ong opened, Estuary, a pescatarian restaurant and oyster bar at Palais Renaissance at Orchard Road.

Ong also has an events and marketing agency, DAGNC, and a construction business, ProGreen Systems.

== Personal life ==
Ong had a short-lived marriage with his secondary schoolmate when he was 23. The marriage lasted only for months.

Ong announced his engagement to actress Jaime Teo in July 2007 after dating her for two years and married her in September that year. A wedding ceremony was held in April 2008. They had their 1st child in April 2010. On 31 December 2016, Ong and Teo announced on Instagram that they had formalized their divorce in August, and that they are both now co-parenting their child Renee.

Ong married for the third time on 2 February 2020 to art teacher, Fay Tan. In March 2021, Ong announced that he and Tan are expecting their first child. Ong also has a stepdaughter, Gretel, from Tan’s previous relationship.
