= 1972 Queenstown shooting =

Unsolved Singaporean murder case

- Location: Queenstown, Singapore
- Date: September 17, 1972
- Attack type: Murder
- Weapon: Possibly a rifle or shotgun
- Deaths: 1
- Victim: Chan Chee Chan
- Perpetrator: Unknown

On the afternoon of 17 September 1972, 22-year-old Malaysian seamstress Chan Chee Chan (Note: Her name was also spelt as Chen Lee Chern.) (Chinese: 曾丽珍; pinyin: Zēng Lìzhēn) was walking along Queenstown, Singapore when she was shot in the chest. Chan was hit by a .22 calibre bullet fired from a distance. To this day, the case remains unsolved.

== Shooting ==
At about 12.30 pm on 17 September 1972, Chan Chee Chan and her younger sister Kim Moy were walking along Commonwealth Avenue towards Queen's Circus when Chee Chan suddenly called out in pain. Initially, Kim Moy thought her sister was having a stomachache, and she handed her sister some medicated oil. However, Chee Chan collapsed and blood oozed out of the wound on her left chest.

The bullet was fired from a distance of at least 30 feet (9.144 metres) and from an angle of 30 degrees to the left. It was believed to fired from inside one of the nearby 16-storey Housing Board flats.

Chan Chee Chan was sent by ambulance to Outram Hospital (now Singapore General Hospital). Police officers went to the hospital to record her statement; however she remained unconscious and she died several hours later. A .22 calibre bullet was extracted from her chest.

== Police investigations ==
As part of investigations, the police seized a total of nine rifles and one pistol from licensed gun owners in the vicinity of Queenstown, and test-fired them. However, they found that the .22 calibre bullet that killed Chan was not fired from any of them. A total of six witnesses who heard the gunshot contacted the police. One of them, who had experience with firearms, was confident that the shot came from a rifle.

Chan lived a quiet life and her family did not believe she had any enemies who wanted her killed. However, a theory emerged that her sister Kim Moy, who was with her at the time of the shooting, may have been the intended target of the shooting that killed Chee Chan, and that the gunman could be a rejected suitor or hired killer.

In March 1973, a coroner's hearing was held inquiring into the shooting of Chan Chee Chan. When asked by the coroner if any silencer could have been used, police firearms specialist Assistant Superintendent Lee Ah Fong said that silencers were not available in Singapore but the gunman could have made his own silencer. Inspector Ng Ah Kow, who investigated the case, also testified that the police had seized the firearms from nearby residents for test-firing; however there was no match. The coroner returned an open verdict.

== Aftermath ==
In the days following the shooting, Chan Chee Chan's sisters went into hiding and locked up their Tanglin Halt flat, due to the possibility that Kim Moy may have been the intended target of the shooting.

In 2022, the shooting was portrayed in the Chinese-language crime show Inside Crime Scene, on the fifth episode of the show's first season.

== See also ==
- List of major crimes in Singapore
