= Tan Siak Kew =

Singaporean businessman (1903–1977)

- Born: 31 May 1903; Kim Sar, Teo Ann district, Guangdong, China
- Died: 5 February 1977 (aged 73)
- Education: St. Anthony's Boys' School, Raffles Institution
- Occupations: businessman, politician, diplomat
- Known for: member, Legislative Assembly of Singapore; president, Singapore Chinese Chamber of Commerce
- Spouse: married
- Children: 5 sons, 3 daughters

Notes
- spent much of his life in Singapore

Tan Siak Kew (31 May 1903 - 5 February 1977) was a Singaporean businessman, a member of the Legislative Assembly of Singapore, the president of the Singapore Chinese Chamber of Commerce and a diplomat.

== Early life and education ==
Tan was born on 31 May 1903 in the village of Kim Sar, Teo Ann district in Guangdong, China. He came to Singapore in 1910. After arriving, he attended St. Anthony's Boys' School and later Raffles Institution but returned to China before graduated to look after his father, whose health had deteriorated. There, he attended a private school.

== Career ==
Tan returned to Singapore in 1921 and became a clerk at the Overseas Assurance Corporation. He and two friends set up a produce business, Buan Lee Seng, in 1930s. In 1937, he became a committee member of the Singapore Chinese Chamber of Commerce. From 1952 to 1975, he served as the governing director of Buan Lee Seng. He became a member of the Nanyang University Council in 1953. He was also a developer of the Sennett Estate. In 1948, he became the president of the Singapore Chinese Exchange Produce, a role that he held until in 1966. From 1950 to 1952, he served as the vice-president of the Singapore Chinese Chamber of Commerce. Siak Kew Avenue in Sennett Estate was named after him in 1951.

He was elected the president of the Singapore Chinese Chamber of Commerce in 1952, a position which he held until 1954. He was re-elected as president in 1956, and held the position until 1958. From 1955 to 1956, he served as the chairman of the Teochew Poit Ip Huay Kuan. He was nominated as a member of the Legislative Assembly of Singapore in 1958, a position which he held for a year. He was conferred the Pingat Jasa Gemilang in 1964. In 1965, he served as the president of the Ngee Ann Kongsi. From 1965 to 1966, he again served as the chairman of the Teochew Poit Ip Huay Kuan. He was a member of the Nanyang University Council from 1966 to 1970. He was appointed the first Singaporean ambassador to Thailand in 1966. From 1969 to 1976, he served as the honorary chairman of the Teochew Poit Ip Huay Kuan. He also served as the chairman of the Four Seas Communications Bank from the 1960s to the 1970s and was a member of the Singapore Harbour Board and the Chinese Advisory Board.

He was the chairman of the Schools Appeal Board and a member of the Pineapples Appeal Board and the Rubber Appeal Board. He was associated with the Singapore Telephone Board.

== Personal life and death ==
Tan was married and had five sons and three daughters. He died on 5 February 1977.

In 2014, a biography of him written by Fiona Tan, titled Tan Siak Kew: Going Against the Grain, was published.
