= Sentosa Satellite Earth Station =

Satellite Earth station in Singapore

Coordinates: 1.247°N 103.836°E

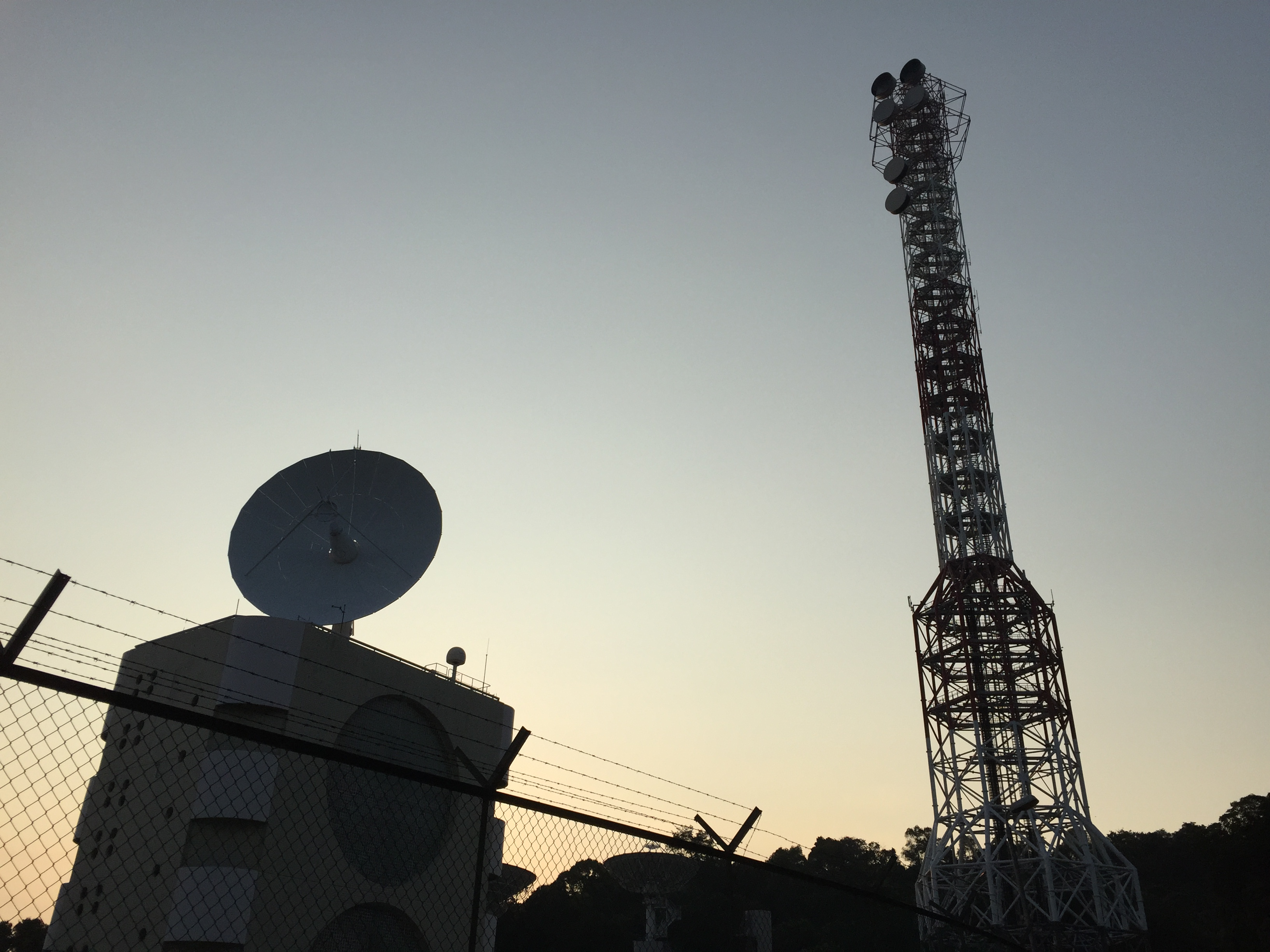
Satellite dish of the Sentosa Satellite Earth Station

The Sentosa Satellite Earth Station (Chinese: 圣淘沙卫星地面站; Malay: Stesen Satelit Bumi Sentosa) is Singapore's first satellite Earth station, located on Sentosa Island. It was opened on 23 October 1971 by then-president Benjamin Sheares. The second antenna was built two years later, in 1972, as the amount of traffic grew. This station is managed and owned by Singtel.
