= List of presidents of Singapore =

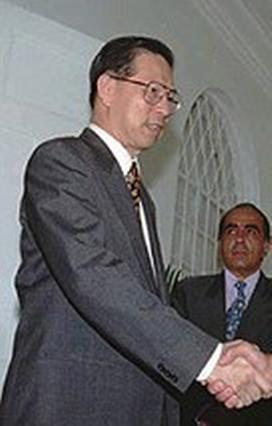
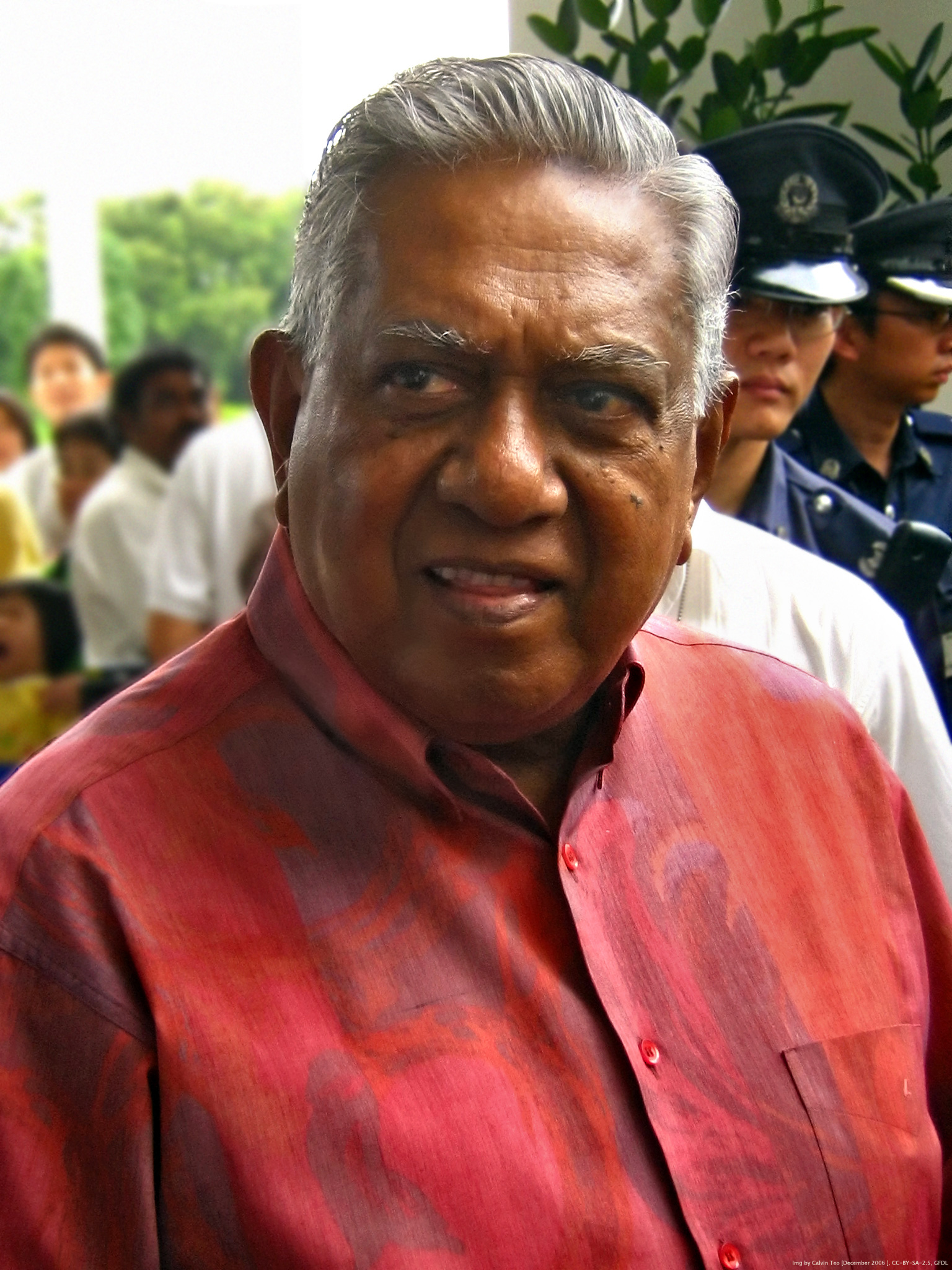
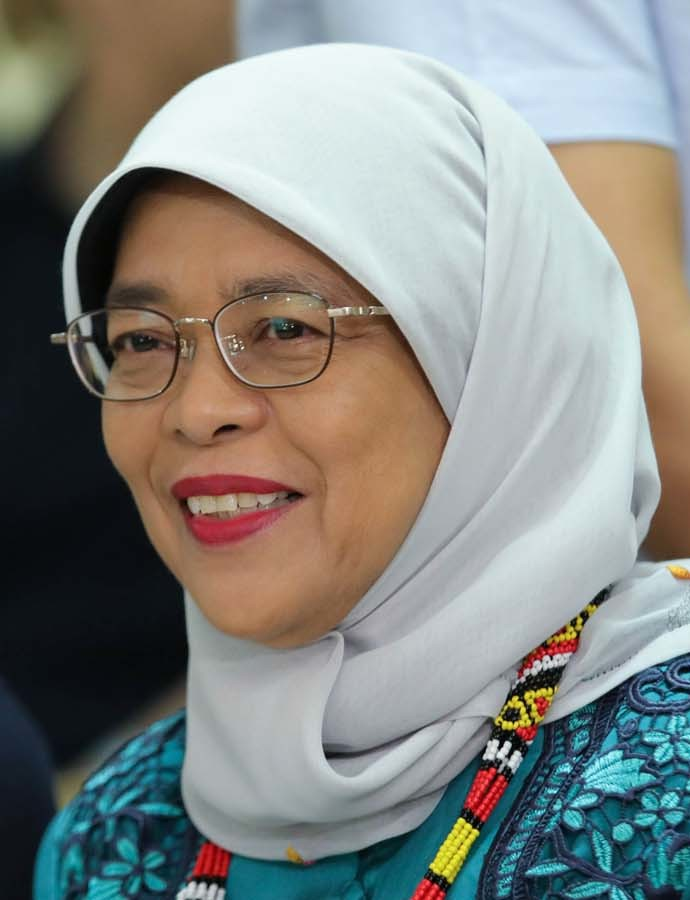
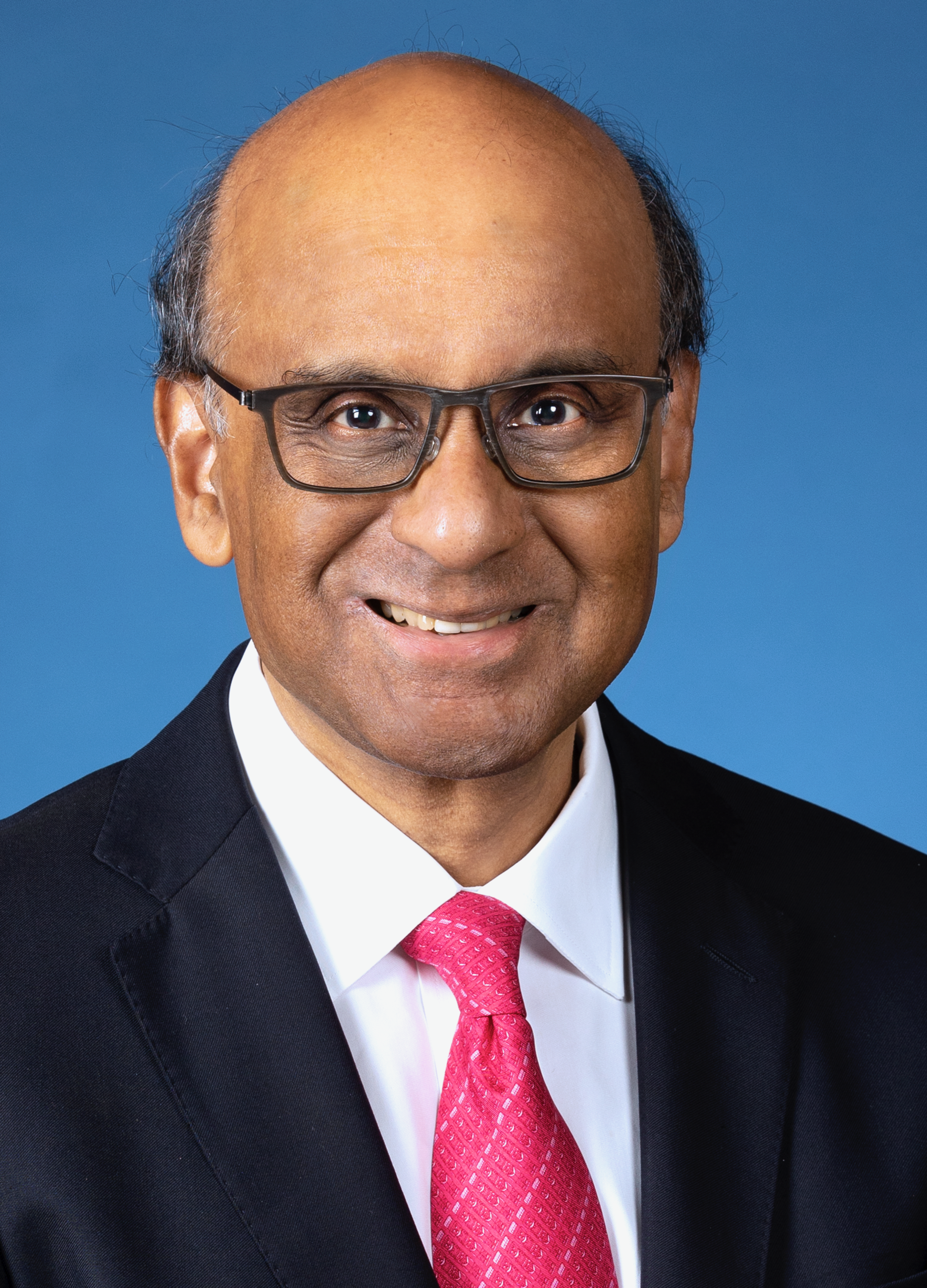
- Top left: Ong Teng Cheong was the first president to be elected by popular vote.
- Top right: S. R. Nathan was the longest serving president of Singapore.
- Bottom left: Halimah Yacob was the first female president of Singapore.
- Bottom right: Tharman Shanmugaratnam is the incumbent president of Singapore.

The President of Singapore is the head of state of the Republic of Singapore. Preceded by the Yang di-Pertuan Negara of Singapore, the office of president was created on 22 December 1965 after Singapore's independence in August 1965, with Yang di-Pertuan Negara Yusof Ishak serving as the first president. Under the Constitution, presidents must be a Singaporean citizen, non-partisan, and elected by a popular vote.

Originally elected by Parliament, a 1991 constitutional amendment was made to allow for the president to be directly elected by a popular vote, with the 1993 presidential election between Ong Teng Cheong and Chua Kim Yeow being the first time a president was directly elected by popular vote. Singapore follows a non-executive model of the Westminster parliamentary system where the president serves as the head of state, separate to the head of government which is instead served by the Cabinet, led by the prime minister. In 2016, a second constitutional amendment was made that allowed for a presidential election to be reserved for an ethnic community in Singapore if no one from that community had served as president for the last five presidential terms.

The role of the president was originally ceremonial and symbolic, carrying residual powers, however the role was later given executive powers such as the reserve power to veto certain bills, most notably in relation to Singapore's reserves as a check and balance process as well as revoking and appointing public service appointments among other powers listed in the Constitution. The president also represents the country at official diplomatic functions, with a 2023 constitutional amendment allowing the president to take up appointments internationally which are of interest of Singapore.

There have been nine presidents since Singapore gained independence in 1965. The term of president was previously 4 years, with it being extended to 6 years following the 1991 constitutional amendment. Two presidents, Yusof Ishak and Benjamin Sheares, have died in office; one president, Devan Nair, has resigned mid-term; and the longest serving president is S. R. Nathan, at 12 years over two terms.

== List of presidents ==
No.	Portrait	Name (Birth–Death)	Term of office			Election (Note: Prior to 1991, the President was indirectly elected by Parliament. In 1991, a constitutional amendment was made for the President to be directly elected by voters.)	Prime Minister
No.	Portrait	Name (Birth–Death)	Took office	Left office	Time in office	Election	Prime Minister
1		Yusof Ishak (1910–1970)	9 August 1965	23 November 1970 (Note: Died in office)	5 years, 106 days (Note: If his role as Yang-de Pertuan Negara is acknowledged, Yusof Ishak's time in office would be 10 years, 355 days.)	— (Note: Yusof Ishak previously served as the Yang di-Pertuan Negara of Singapore after being appointed the role in 1959, when Singapore was granted internal self-governance from the British. He served in this role as the head of state from 3 December 1959 to 9 August 1965.)	Lee Kuan Yew
1		Yusof Ishak (1910–1970)	9 August 1965	23 November 1970	5 years, 106 days	1967	Lee Kuan Yew
—		Speaker of Parliament; Yeoh Ghim Seng (1918–1993); Acting	23 November 1970	2 January 1971	40 days	—	Lee Kuan Yew
2		Benjamin Sheares (1907–1981)	2 January 1971	12 May 1981	10 years, 130 days	1970	Lee Kuan Yew
2		Benjamin Sheares (1907–1981)	2 January 1971	12 May 1981	10 years, 130 days	1974	Lee Kuan Yew
2		Benjamin Sheares (1907–1981)	2 January 1971	12 May 1981	10 years, 130 days	1978	Lee Kuan Yew
—		Chief Justice; Wee Chong Jin (1917–2005); Acting	12 May 1981	14 May 1981	2 days	—	Lee Kuan Yew
—		Speaker of Parliament; Yeoh Ghim Seng (1918–1993); Acting	14 May 1981	23 October 1981	162 days	—	Lee Kuan Yew
3		Devan Nair (1923–2005)	23 October 1981	28 March 1985 (Note: Devan Nair resigned following reports of alcoholism and sexual misconduct.)	3 years, 156 days	1981	Lee Kuan Yew
—		Chief Justice; Wee Chong Jin (1917–2005); Acting	28 March 1985	31 March 1985	3 days	—	Lee Kuan Yew
—		Speaker of Parliament; Yeoh Ghim Seng (1918–1993); Acting	31 March 1985	2 September 1985	155 days	—	Lee Kuan Yew
4		Wee Kim Wee (1915–2005)	2 September 1985	1 September 1993	7 years, 364 days	1985	Lee Kuan Yew
4		Wee Kim Wee (1915–2005)	2 September 1985	1 September 1993	7 years, 364 days	1989	Lee Kuan Yew
4		Wee Kim Wee (1915–2005)	2 September 1985	1 September 1993	7 years, 364 days	1989	Goh Chok Tong
5		Ong Teng Cheong (1936–2002)	1 September 1993	1 September 1999	6 years	1993	Goh Chok Tong
6		S. R. Nathan (1924–2016)	1 September 1999	1 September 2011	12 years	1999	Goh Chok Tong
6		S. R. Nathan (1924–2016)	1 September 1999	1 September 2011	12 years	1999	Lee Hsien Loong
6		S. R. Nathan (1924–2016)	1 September 1999	1 September 2011	12 years	2005	Lee Hsien Loong
7		Tony Tan (born 1940)	1 September 2011	1 September 2017	6 years	2011	Lee Hsien Loong
—		Chairman of the Council of Presidential Advisers; J. Y. Pillay (born 1934); Acting	1 September 2017	14 September 2017	13 days	—	Lee Hsien Loong
8		Halimah Yacob (born 1954)	14 September 2017	14 September 2023	6 years	2017	Lee Hsien Loong
9		Tharman Shanmugaratnam (born 1957)	14 September 2023	Incumbent	3 years, 65 days	2023	Lee Hsien Loong
9		Tharman Shanmugaratnam (born 1957)	14 September 2023	Incumbent	3 years, 65 days	2023	Lawrence Wong

== See also ==
- Politics of Singapore
- Presidential elections in Singapore
- Spouse of the president of Singapore
