= Sheares =

Sheares is a surname. Notable people with the surname include:

- Benjamin Sheares (1907–1981), president of Singapore from 1971 to 1981

- Benjamin Sheares Bridge, the longest bridge in Singapore

- Constance Sheares (born 1941), Singaporean arts administrator, curator, and writer
- Joseph Sheares (born 1943), Singaporean surgeon
- Yeo Seh Geok Sheares (1917–2012), First Lady of Singapore from 1971 to 1981
- Sheares brothers, Henry (1753–98) and John (1766–1798), Irish lawyers and republicans
