= Joseph Sheares =

Singaporean surgeon (born 1943)

- Born: Joseph Henry Hinggian Sheares; 1943 (age 82–83); Syonan (present-day Singapore)
- Other name: Joseph H. H. Sheares
- Education: University of Cambridge Medical School
- Occupation: Surgeon
- Parent(s): Benjamin Sheares (father); Yeo Seh Geok Sheares (mother)
- Relatives: Constance Sheares (sister)

Joseph Henry Hinggian Sheares (born 1943), also known as Joseph H. H. Sheares, is a Singaporean surgeon who specialises in cardiothoracic surgery. Born in Japanese-occupied Singapore to future president and First Lady Benjamin and Yeo Seh Geok Sheares, respectively, he had his education in the United Kingdom. He initially worked at Tan Tock Seng Hospital before joining Mount Elizabeth Hospital to set up a cardiac surgery unit, which would be the second in Singapore.

Throughout his career, Sheares was involved with organisations such as the ASEAN Congress of Cardiology and served as the advisor to the government of Myanmar alongside Leslie Lam from 1993 to 1996. In the 2010s, he would serve on multiple disciplinary tribunals. He was awarded an honorary degree of Doctor of Medicine from the University of Sheffield in 1994.

== Early life and education ==
Sheares was born in 1943 in Japanese-occupied Singapore to obstetrician Benjamin Sheares and midwife Yeo Seh Geok Sheares, the second of three children; his older sister is curator Constance. His Chinese name, Hinggian, was given to him by his mother and means "most filial". Sheares' parents would later go on to become the president and First Lady of Singapore in 1971. Due to his father's work at Kandang Kerbau Hospital (KKH), from 1945 to 1951 he and his siblings lived in Block 3 of KKH.

Sheares had his education overseas in the United Kingdom's University of Cambridge Medical School, further training at The National Heart Hospital and Hammersmith Hospital for three years. In his youth, after he travelled to Houston, Texas, with the elder Sheares and watched Michael DeBakey perform on an aneurysm, he became interested in cardiothoracic surgery and would choose to specialise in it.

== Career ==
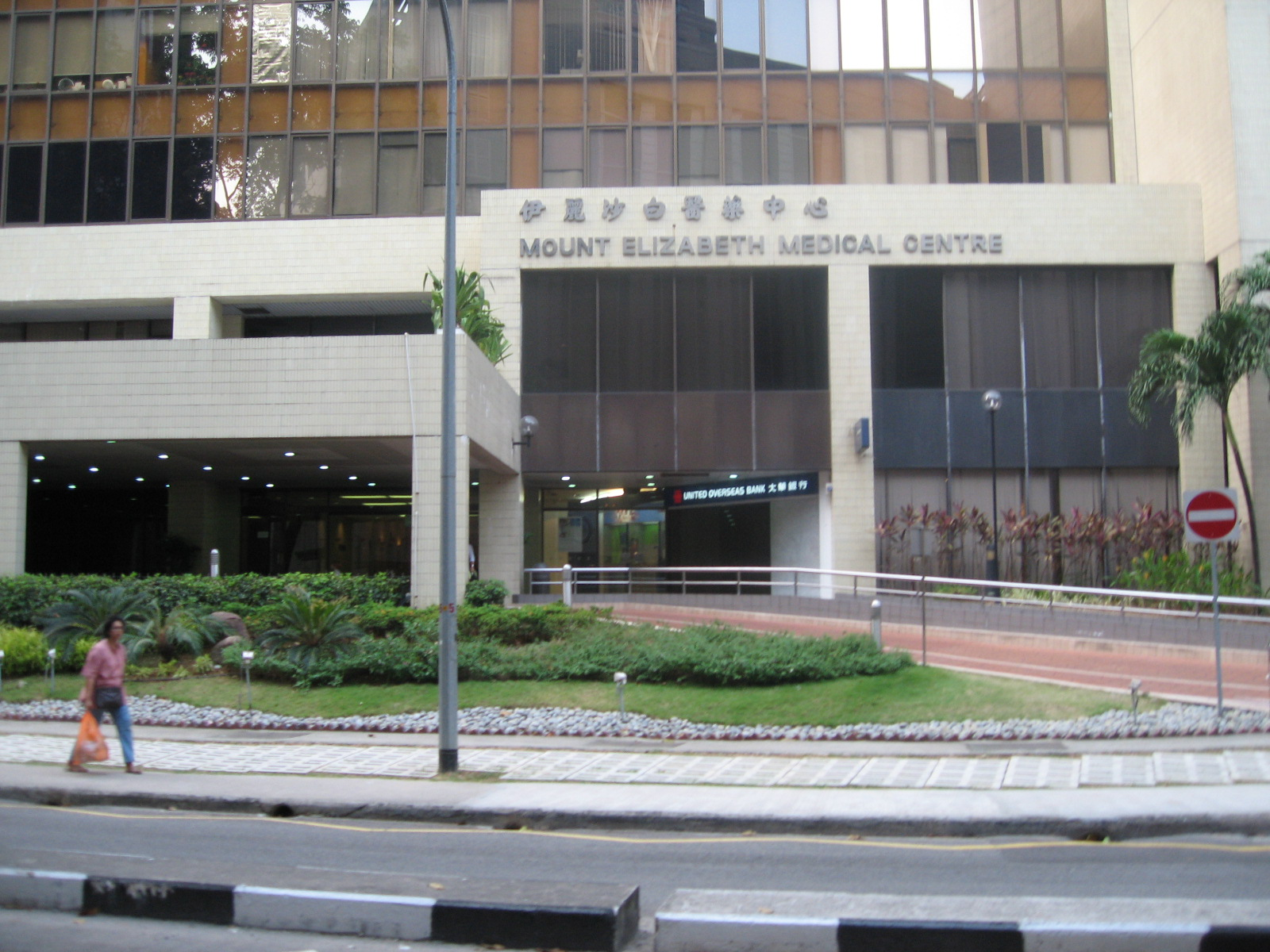
Sheares began working at the Mount Elizabeth Hospital (pictured) sometime in 1981.

In 1975, after he returned from the United Kingdom to Singapore, Sheares began working with a team at Tan Tock Seng Hospital. In 1980, he delivered a talk about the success rate in cardiac surgery at Kallang Community Centre. He and his team were later invited to work at the newly opened Mount Elizabeth Hospital, where they opened a cardiac surgery unit; it was the second cardiac surgery unit in Singapore. Despite debate on the practicality of having a cardiac surgery unit in a private hospital such as Mount Elizabeth, they persevered and eventually began an open-heart programme.

Sheares' first case with Mount Elizabeth was in February 1981, where he headed a twelve-member team and treated a four-year-old Malaysian girl with a ventricular septal defect (hole in heart). (Note: This Straits Times article incorrectly identifies him as Robert Sheares.) In 1983, he treated a six-year-old Malaysian boy with a hole in his heart. In 1985, after listening in on an interview with William DeVries and Robert Jarvik on artificial hearts, Sheares praised the invention of the artificial heart but stated that "we want to wait for the long-term results" before implementing them in Singapore.

In 1988, following the death of a two-year-old Indonesian girl two years prior whom Sheares performed surgery on, a coroner's inquiry was opened to determine the cause of death. Sheares' initial statement was that the girl had died of a hole in her heart due to swelling, but in court amended his statement to death by brain damage following the issues with her heart. This was agreed upon by consultant neurologist Nei I Ping and Ng Peng Hong; the inquiry was launched by the girl's relatives.

In 1990, Sheares, as the chairman of the ASEAN Congress of Cardiology, was one of ten surgeons who performed "surgery-free" treatment on fifteen patients at Mount Elizabeth Hospital. The treatment, percutaneous transluminal coronary angioplasty, was broadcast live to 200 other surgeons from Southeast Asia, Taiwan, Japan, and Australia in Mount Elizabeth's lecture theatre. In April 1993, Sheares and Leslie Lam were appointed as consultants and advisers to the Myanmar government. He and Lam traveled to Myanmar around three times a year for the following three years. In September, Sheares along with two other surgeons performed the first cardiomyoplasty in Singapore.

In 1994, he received an honorary Doctor of Medicine degree from the University of Sheffield. He was also a part of a team of thirty doctors that performed surgery at a symposium in Yangon, Myanmar. In 1995, as part of his appointment to Myanmar, Sheares was a member of a delegation who offered free operations and training for a week there.

In 2018, Sheares chaired two disciplinary tribunals. The first saw a doctor who had molested two patients in 2014 bring removed from the register of medical practitioners, while the second had a surgeon suspended for his "bewildering" conduct. In 2019, Sheares chaired another tribunal which resulted in a psychiatrist being fined S$50,000 for exposing private information about a patient.
