= KKH =

KKH may refer to:

- the Karakoram Highway in northern Pakistan
- KK Women's and Children's Hospital, formerly known as "Kandang Kerbau Hospital", a hospital in Singapore
- Kongiganak Airport (IATA code: KKH), an airport in Alaska

== See also ==
- kkh, the ISO 639 code for the Khün language of Myanmar
- KKh 060, a galaxy
