= Constance Sheares =

Singaporean curator (born 1941)

- Born: 4 October 1941 (age 84); Singapore
- Occupation: Art curator
- Parent(s): Benjamin Sheares (father); Yeo Seh Geok Sheares (mother)
- Relatives: Joseph Sheares (brother)

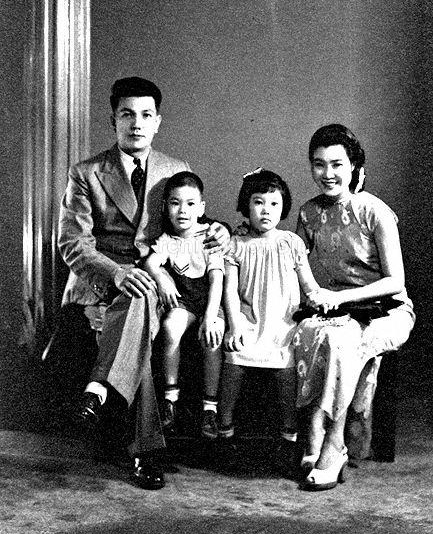
Sheares with her mother, father, and brother c. 1946

Constance Alice Chengliu Sheares (born 4 October 1941) is a Singaporean arts administrator, curator, and writer. Sheares helped establish the National Museum Art Gallery in 1976, curating its inaugural exhibition and other major exhibitions. Through exhibitions, publications, and acquisitions initiated at the Museum, Sheares helped to shape the basis of art institutions and art historical discourse in Singapore.

She was a curator at the National Museum of Singapore between 1971 and 1976, and 1982 to 1988, and later an independent curator and consultant for various organisations. In 2025, Sheares was inducted into the Singapore Women's Hall of Fame.

== Early life ==
Born in Singapore in 1941, Sheares grew up in a Singapore recovering from World War II. Sheares is the daughter of Benjamin Sheares, a doctor at Kandang Kerbau Hospital who later became the second president of Singapore in 1971, and Yeo Seh Geok Sheares.

She attended the Raffles Girls' School from 1947 to 1958. In 1959, she moved to the United Kingdom to attend the private boarding school, Roedean School, until 1960. Between 1962 and 1966, Sheares attended the Courtauld Institute of Art, graduating with a Bachelor of Arts (Honours) in European art history, later obtaining a master's degree in Asian art history from the University of Singapore, studying there from 1967 to 1970. Sheares would write her master's thesis on Southeast Asian textiles, with her later fieldwork and acquisitions for the museum serving as one of the most valuable resources on the subject matter. In 1971, she went to work at the National Museum, where she was the curator of anthropology.

== Career ==
=== Beginnings of the National Museum Art Gallery ===
During the 1970s, Sheares helped in establishing the National Museum Art Gallery, a period of time when Singapore was developing its museum know-how. After National Museum's natural history collection was reorganised in the early 70s, it was decided that the freed up space would be converted into an art gallery, a facility lacking in Singapore at the time, with development starting in 1973. Following a study trip alongside over twenty international curators in the United States, Sheares, working alongside Choy Weng Yang, would see to the creation of a "big white-shed" for the National Museum Art Gallery, a white cube gallery space with white walls, lighting tracks, and power points on floors for lit vitrines.

Archival images of ART 76, the inaugural exhibition of the National Museum Art Gallery, curated by Constance Sheares

In 1976, Sheares curated the inaugural exhibition at the National Museum Art Gallery, titled ART 76. An exhibition by invitation, the artworks were chosen based on the guidelines established by a selection committee which included Sheares herself, among others. Eventually, 150 artworks by 92 artists were selected, featuring works by Singapore artists such as Ng Eng Teng, Goh Beng Kwan, Thomas Yeo, Teo Eng Seng and Anthony Poon. A survey of paintings and sculptural works from that moment in time, emerging and established artists were presented side by side, with Sheares believing that the exhibition "should give rise to a much healthy controversy."

Shortly after from 1976 to 1982, Sheares would move to the Netherlands, and the designer and artist Choy Weng Yang would take over her role as the Curator of Art. When Sheares returned to Singapore in 1982, she rejoined the museum as the Curator of Southeast Asian Ethnology, later resuming her role as the Curator of Art after Choy retired in 1985.

=== Further curatorial work in the 80s ===
Sheares was involved in the design and display of the Southeast Asian Gallery when it was renovated in 1982, and in the transfer of exhibits from the teaching collection of the then University of Singapore to the museum. During her time as curator, Sheares would bring in half a million dollars' worth of contemporary art for the museum, through public funding and private donations. Sheares was one of the visitors to the first exhibitions at The Artists Village in Ulu Sembawang, an artist commune in a farming area founded by performance artist Tang Da Wu. Works by Tang, Vincent Leow and Wong Shih Yeow would be acquired soon after her visit.

Since the early 80s, Sheares and the museum would lobby for a larger space for the display and storage of artworks. In 1987, after six years of lobbying and discussions, it was announced that the National Museum Art Gallery would take over the St. Joseph's Institution building at Bras Basah Road, what would eventually launch in 1996 as the Singapore Art Museum.

In 1988, Sheares would leave the National Museum Art Gallery, continuing to promote art and acting as a consultant to art buyers, also lecturing on art history. She acted as consultant to Deutsche Bank in their acquisition of Singapore artworks for their local offices, and also curated exhibitions of the artists they supported, such as Henri Chen KeZhan, Eng Tow, Goh Beng Kwan, S. Chandrasekaran and Jimmy Ong.

=== Later curatorial work ===
Sheares was art consultant for the Land Transport Authority's Art in Transit programme, which integrated public art into the Mass Rapid Transit stations along the North East line that began in 1997 and started operation in 2003, the most geographically extensive public art project in Singapore. Sheares would recommend and work with artists most likely to create works that could integrated within the architectural structure of the stations, featuring works by Singapore artists such as Tan Swie Hian, Chua Ek Kay and Milenko & Delia Prvački, the Art in Transit programme would continue on for future MRT lines in Singapore.

Sheares was also on the acquisition committees of the Singapore Art Museum and the National Museum of Singapore, also involved in the acquisition of art for Changi Airport Terminal 3, and is further credited for the art exhibited at locations such as The Istana and Parliament House. In 2025, she was inducted into the Singapore Women's Hall of Fame.

== Publications ==
Sheares would write her master's thesis on Southeast Asian Textiles, further writing several books and monographs on Singapore art, some of which include Batik in Singapore (1975), Contemporary Art in Singapore: Where East Meets West (1991), Bodies Transformed: Ng Eng Teng in the Nineties (1999) and Paintings by Chua Ek Kay: Collection of Merrill Lynch International Private Client Group Asia Pacific (2000). Sheares' essay, "Threads of Tradition, Dyed and Woven," was published in T.K. Sabapathy's book, Past, Present, Beyond: Re-nascence of an Art Collection (2002).
