= Yeo Seh Geok =

First Lady of Singapore from 1971 to 1981

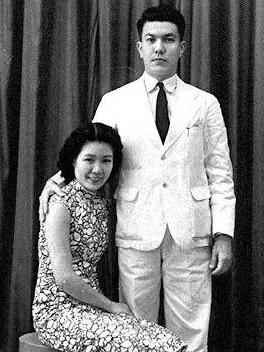
- Yeo with her husband Benjamin Sheares, c. 1939

First Lady of Singapore
- In office 2 January 1971 – 12 May 1981
- President: Benjamin Sheares
- Preceded by: Puan Noor Aishah
- Succeeded by: Avadai Dhanam Lakshimi

Personal details
- Born: 6 March 1917 Quanzhou, Republic of China (present-day People's Republic of China)
- Died: 8 July 2012 (aged 95) Singapore
- Spouse: Benjamin Sheares (m. 1939; died 1981)
- Children: 3; including Constance and Joseph

Yeo Seh Geok Sheares (Chinese: 楊細玉; 6 March 1917 – 8 July 2012) was the First Lady of Singapore when her husband, Benjamin Sheares, served as president from 1971 to 1981. Born in the Republic of China, she would have her early education there before graduating from university in 1937 after taking a liberal arts course.

Her father would then send her to British controlled Singapore to avoid the Japanese invasion of China in 1938, where she would study at Kandang Kerbau Hospital to become a midwife. At the hospital, she met obstetrician Sheares and they subsequently got married. From the 1940s to 1950s, she would raise their three children while Sheares continued working. In 1971, she would become the First Lady following Sheares' successful election to the presidency.

During her time as First Lady, she served as the patron for many organisations and attended multiple events. Yeo would serve as First Lady for a decade, ending after Sheares died in office. Yeo died in 2012.

== Early life and education ==
Yeo was born on 6 March 1917, in Quanzhou, Fujian, Republic of China. She had three brothers and two sisters. She had her early education at Puay Eng Girls' School in Quanzhou in 1935 before studying at Chung San National University in Guangdong the following year. Yeo spent a year at the university, taking a liberal arts course.

In July 1938, Yeo was sent to Singapore in the Straits Settlements by her father to avoid the Japanese invasion of China. Yeo worked at a bookstore and department store for a brief stint. She then studied midwifery at Kandang Kerbau Hospital, where she met Benjamin Sheares, an obstetrician working there. Despite her education and training as a midwife, Yeo did not practice midwifery as a profession after marriage.

== First Lady of Singapore ==
In 1971, Yeo would become the second First Lady of Singapore following Sheares' successful election as president. By this time, she spoke English, Chinese, and Malay. During her time as First Lady, she was the patron of many organisations, such as the International Bazaar for the Blind, Children's Charities, Singapore Girl Guides Association, and YWCA of Singapore. Yeo would also visit or open many events. In 1975, she was invited by Indonesian First Lady Siti Hartinah to the opening of an event in Jakarta, Indonesia. Accompanied by four aides, Yeo spent three days there and attended the opening of the Taman Mini Indonesia Indah. During the opening ceremony, she planted a tree there.

On 12 May 1981, Sheares died in office. During his funeral, she placed a wreath on his coffin and was described by The Straits Times as having "presented a picture of composure".

== Personal life ==
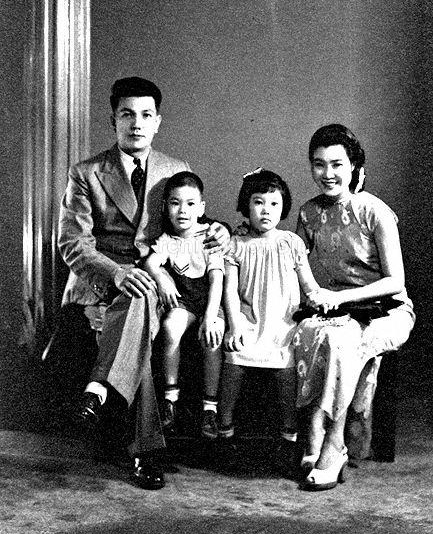
Yeo with her family, c. 1946

While Yeo was working at Kandang Kerbau Hospital, she and Sheares fell in love with each other, despite that she spoke little English and he little Chinese. Additionally, Yeo's parents disapproved of Sheares as he had recently divorced. They got married in 1939.

During their marriage, they had three children – Constance (born 1941), Joseph (born 1943), and Edwin (born 1949) – whom she spent her time raising while Sheares worked at the hospital. In 1953, Yeo accompanied Sheares to England when he travelled there for an operation, subsequently spending an accumulative five years abroad in England from 1960 to 1971.

After her time as First Lady, she led a quiet public life. Yeo died on 8 July 2012 in Singapore.
