= List of international presidential trips made by Tharman Shanmugaratnam =

This is a list of international presidential trips made by Tharman Shanmugaratnam, the 9th President of Singapore.

President Tharman Shanmugaratnam, who took the office of President of Singapore on 14 September 2023, made his first overseas presidential state visit to meet with his counter-part Sultan of Brunei, Hassanal Bolkiah on 25 January 2024 at Bandar Seri Begawan. While he made his first working visit overseas as president to New York City on 27 November 2023. As of October 2026, he has made 27 Presidential Trips to 20 countries during his presidency.

Tharman is currently chair of the Board of Trustees of the Group of Thirty (G30), co-chair of the Global Commission on the Economics of Water (GCEW), co-chair of the High-Level Advisory Council on Jobs and a member of the Board of Trustees of the World Economic Forum (WEF).

== Summary ==
The number of visits per country where President Tharman traveled are:

- One: Belgium, Brunei, Estonia, Egypt, Germany, India, Luxembourg, Mexico, Philippines, South Africa, Sweden, Tanzania, Thailand, United Kingdom
- Two: Italy,Malaysia , Vatican City
- Three: France
- Five: United States
- Six:Switzerland

== 2023 ==
#	Country	Locations	Dates	Details
1	United States	New York City	27 November – 4 December	Working Visit to New York City.

== 2024 ==
#	Country	Locations	Dates	Details
2	Switzerland	Davos; Zurich	16–21 January	Working visit to Switzerland as president.
3	Brunei	Bandar Seri Begawan	24–26 January	State Visit to Brunei as president, first State Visit overseas.
4	Italy	Rome	20–24 June	Working visit to Rome. President Tharman was hosted to an official lunch by President Mattarella.
4	Vatican City	Vatican City	22 June	Private audience with Pope Francis.
4	Finland	Helsinki	25 June	Transiting at Helsinki to Estonia, hosted to breakfast by Finnish President Alexander Stubb
4	Estonia	Tallinn	25–26 June	Official visit to Estonia. Tharman received a ceremonial welcome and met President Alar Karis, Prime Minister of Estonia Kaja Kallas, and President of the Riigikogu Lauri Hussar.
5	France	Paris	24-28 July	Visited Paris, France from 24 to 28 July 2024 for the XXXIII Summer Olympic Games.
6	Philippines	Manila	15-17 August	State Visit to the Philippines.
7	Switzerland	Geneva	20-22 August	President Tharman visited Geneva, Switzerland from 20 to 22 August 2024
7	France	Paris	23 August	President Tharman visited Paris, France on 23 August 2024. He met and gave support to the Singapore athletes participating in the Paralympic Games.
8	United States	Washington, D.C.	22-25 October	Working visit to United States as Co-Chair of the World Bank Group’s High-Level Advisory Council on Jobs and Global Commission on the Economics of Water.

== 2025 ==
#	Country	Locations	Dates	Details
9	India	New Delhi, Odisha	14-18 January	State Visit to India, marking 60 years of relations between Singapore and India at the invitation of President Droupadi Murmu.
10	Switzerland	Davos	21-24 January	Working visit to Switzerland as President. He was accompanied by from the Economic Development Board and the President's Office.
11	Belgium	Brussels	23-26 March	State visit to Brussels as President.
11	Luxembourg	Luxembourg	27 - 28 March	State visit to Luxembourg as President.
12	United States	Washington D.C. & New York City	21-25 April	Working Visit to United States as Co-Chair of the World Bank Group’s High-Level Advisory Council on Jobs. Met with Antonio Guterres.
13	Germany	Berlin	4-8 June	Working Visit to Germany as Chair of the G30 Board of Trustees and for engagements in the Group of Thirty (G30) Spring Plenary.
14	Switzerland	Geneva	18-21 August	Working Visit to Geneva.
15	Malaysia	Perak	25-26 August	Working Visit to Ipoh, Perak.
16	Egypt	Cairo	19-22 September	State Visit to Egypt from 19 to 22 September.
17	United States	Washington, D.C.	13-17 October	Working visit to United States as Co-Chair of the World Bank Group’s High-Level Advisory Council on Jobs and Global Commission on the Economics of Water.
18	Mexico	Mexico City	30 November-3 December	State visit to Mexico, marking 50 years of relations between Singapore and Mexico at the invitation of President Claudia Sheinbaum.
19	United States	Boston, New York City	4-10 December	Working visit to United States.

== 2026 ==
#	Country	Locations	Dates	Details
20	Switzerland	Davos	19–22 January	Working visit to Switzerland as President.
21	France	Paris	3 March	Hosted to dinner by French President Emmanuel Macron, meetings with other thought leaders on global issues.
21	Italy	Rome	4-5 March	Working visit to Rome. President Tharman met President Mattarella and delivered the opening address at a high-level symposium on jobs and economic development jointly organised by the Italian government and the World Bank Group.
21	Vatican City	Vatican City	5 March	Private audience with Pope Leo XIV.
22	South Africa	Cape Town and Johannesburg	2-8 June	Working visit to South Africa as President.
22	Tanzania	Dar es Salaam	8-10 June	State visit to Tanzania as President.
23	United Kingdom	London and Oxford	11-19 June	Working visit to United Kingdom as President.
24	Malaysia	Kuala Lumpur and Selangor	12-15 July	State Visit to Malaysia.
25	Switzerland	Geneva	18-19 August	Working visit to Switzerland as President.
26	Thailand	Bangkok	12 October	Working visit to Thailand as President.
27	Sweden	Stockholm, Gothenburg	17-21 October	State Visit to Sweden as President.

== Future trips ==
Country	Locations	Dates	Details
