= Young Women Muslim Association of Singapore =

Singaporean Muslim women organization

The Young Women Muslim Association of Singapore (YWMA), more commonly known as Persatuan Pemudi Islam Singapura (PPIS) (in Malay), is the oldest Muslim women organization in the world, and a household name for the Muslim community in Singapore. It is a voluntary welfare organization and has official charity status in Singapore.

== History ==
YWMA was founded by a group of young Muslim women professionals in 1952. The group of women, led by Taj Namazie, and under the patronage of Puan Noor Aishah, realized that the Muslim women did not know their rights pertaining to marriage and divorce, and a majority were unskilled and uneducated. This worrying status of the Muslim women sparked off the idea of an association where Muslim women professionals would volunteer to conduct classes for the women in their community and educate them on their rights.

== Activities ==
=== 1950s – 1960s ===
The YWMA started off with very little money to run their services and no place to hold their activities. Most of the activities were held in a local Malay school (Telok Kurau Girls’ School) and meetings were held at co-founder Aishah Alsagoff’s home. During this period, the YWMA fought for their rights of women in the Islamic Syariah court and had basic courses on dressmaking, cooking, language (English and Jawi) and religious studies.

This led to a community where the women could earn a little income for themselves and learnt not to be entirely dependent on their husbands. This empowerment of women sparked off more Muslim women to develop their interests and contribute more to society.

In the mid-1960s, the YWMA organized its first fundraising event, Malam International. The funds from this event was used to kick off many other self-development courses for women in the years to come.

=== 1970s ===
As Singapore attained independence and the government trying to industrialize the young city-state, the YWMA stepped up their services to prepare the Muslim women for the challenges of a changing society.

The YWMA formulated courses that were more catered to the growing modern world, such as Basic Electricity Course and Financial Management courses. The YWMA started to conduct flag-days, with help from student volunteers, to fund their activities.

With more funding, the YWMA extended its services to beyond that of just developing housewives. The Social Affairs Department of YWMA started to visit several girls' homes to tutor and mentor these young girls so that they could learn to rebuild their lives.

=== 1980s ===
The 1980s was significant as it saw the YWMA shift from small scale courses and social work to being a serious organization. The YWMA set up its first kindergarten to emphasize the importance of early education in the Muslim community. Within the kindergartens, there were courses for the parents, such as Effective Parenting and Personal Growth. Such courses were aimed at creating a strong family unit, which would nurture children who would grow up to be aspiring adults.

=== 1990s – present ===
The services provided by the YWMA in the 1980s expanded and carried on well into the 1990s, with more kindergartens and childcare centers. However, with the introduction of self-help groups, the YWMA stopped its tutoring and focused more on helping single parent families with very low income. Young mothers were taught how to cope with financial burdens and the stress of bringing up children. The YWMA provided emotional support of such young women.

In addition, the rise in Malay youth delinquency and young unwed mothers led to the YWMA opening up a professional counselling service for distressed youths and families. Professional social workers were employed and camps and other workshops were conducted to bond youths and strengthen their faith in their religion.

== Patron ==
Toh Puan Noor Aishah Mohammad Salim, First Lady of Singapore from 1965 to 1970, was a patron of the Association.
