= Leslie Lam =

Leslie Lam may refer to:

- Leslie Lam (doctor) (born 1942), Singaporean cardiologist
- Leslie Lam (table tennis), Hong Kong-Canadian para table tennis player
- Leslie Lam, a fictional character featured in the Hong Kong Disneyland attraction Ant-Man and The Wasp: Nano Battle!
