= 1972 Robinsons department store fire =

Disaster in Singapore

- Date: November 21, 1972
- Location: Raffles Place, Singapore
- Type: Fire
- Cause: Short circuit
- Deaths: 9
- Property damage: SG $21 million

On 21 November 1972, a fire broke out at a Robinson & Co. department store in Raffles Place, Singapore. The fire killed nine people and is regarded as one of the worst fires in Singapore's history. A subsequent investigation revealed the cause of the fire was a short circuit. Safety recommendations were produced in the investigation report which are still adhered today.

== Background ==
Spicer & Robinson was established at present-day Raffles Place in 1858 by Philip Robinson and business partner James Gaborian Spicer. The business mainly sold grocery including crackers, ham, cheese, and tea from a warehouse. It was renamed to Robinson and Co. in 1859 when Spicer left the business. The warehouse was relocated to across St Andrew's Cathedral, and the business expanded to millinery and dressmaking. Among its most notable customers was King Mongkut of Siam. In 1886, the business returned to Raffles Places.

== Fire ==
The fire occurred at 09:55 while employees were working inside the department store. The fire was the result of a short circuit due an overloaded electrical branch on the first floor. An employee in the store saw wires on the ceiling catching fire and sparks shooting across "like a dynamite fuse". Drapes on the wall caught fire and rapidly spread. People in the department store were evacuated by its internal fire-fighting team while also attempting to extinguish the blaze. There were about 350 employees and 200 others in the building at the time of the fire. It took minutes for the fire to engulf the four-storey building. The building's fire protection methods were insufficient and flammable items caused the fire to intensify into an inferno. Nine persons were killed, including eight people trapped in an elevator when power was lost. Another fatality was discovered on the second floor restroom. A pregnant woman was among the dead. Eight of those killed were store employees and another was a shopper. The fire caused the statue of the Roman God Mercury situated on the roof to melt. An eyewitness recalled gray smoke which turned black while leaving the building. The fire rose up to 61 m (200 ft) at a point, and was seen from Toa Payoh and Jurong.

== Response ==
Eighteen fire trucks arrived at 10:13, however the three nearby fire hydrants had failed and water pressure was too weak or had faulty equipment. The hoses also did not fit and came off the fire hydrants. Firefighters sought to pumping water from the Singapore River to fight the fire. An adjacent jewellery store had its doors hacked open by firefighters to douse the fire. By 12:20, the fire was under control. Some employees who attempted to douse the fire but were not allowed into the building. At night time, firefighters were still putting out the fire. Six people were rescued from one of the three elevators in the store–firefighters were unable to access the two other elevators due to the heat.

== Aftermath ==
All goods in the store were destroyed and only the shell of the building remained. The floors which were wood had been burnt. By the following morning, Police cleared the debris and search for bodies. While human remains were recovered, smoke was still rising from the debris. Thirty cars in the basement of the department store were undamaged, the thick basement walls prevent the intense heat from reaching. Vehicle owners were allowed to retrieve their vehicles on the evening of 22 November, although six cars remained in the basement.

The fire also damaged the roof of the Overseas Union Bank located beside the department store. Business around the area ceased and Stock Exchange at Collyer Quay ceased trading on 21 November after 11:00. The area was closed off by Police to prevent looting. Nearby buildings were evacuated.

On 23 November, the National Trades Union Congress began a fund, donating SG $1,000 for families of union members thought to have died in the fire. The Tanglin branch of Standard Chartered donated SG $160. The funding was organized by the Singapore Manual and Mercantile Workers’ Union, representing 160 employees of the store–five of the dead were union members. By 14 December, SG $25,483 had been raised.

Robinsons issued an official statement revealing plans to open a new store before Christmas. The initial plan was to reconstruct the store at the original location due to Robinson's bound to a lease agreement with the landlord until 1990, the Portuguese Catholic Mission. However, the land was acquired by the government in January 1973 for redevelopment. A new Robinsons department store opened on 11 December at Specialists' Shopping Centre in Orchard Road and remained there for 11 years. The store relocated to The Centrepoint in 1983.

== Inquiry ==
President Benjamin Sheares appointed three people as members of the Commission of Inquiry with Justice F. A. Chua leading the inquiry. A professor of electrical engineering at the University of Singapore and member of the Housing and Development Board were also members of the commission. The inquiry into the cause of the fire also scrutinized existing fire prevention procedures, staff training during a fire and fire drills, frequency of inspections of electrical components, fire prevention measures observed by Robinsons and building management, the building—in particularly, walls and floors, and actions of the Fire Brigade in response to a fire. President Sheares also tasked the commission to provide recommendations for building management and occupants to follow so similar disasters do not repeat in the future.

The commission report was presented to President Sheares in August 1973, and released to the public on 1 December 1973. The report revealed insufficient fire protection practices and large quantities of flammable items stores in unapproved loft stores in the Robinsons department store. These items allowed the fire to intensify into an inferno. The report also found no culpability with the fire brigade although by the time they arrived, the store was unsalvageable.
