= 1981 Singaporean presidential election =

Presidential election in Singapore

← 1978	23 October 1981	1985 →
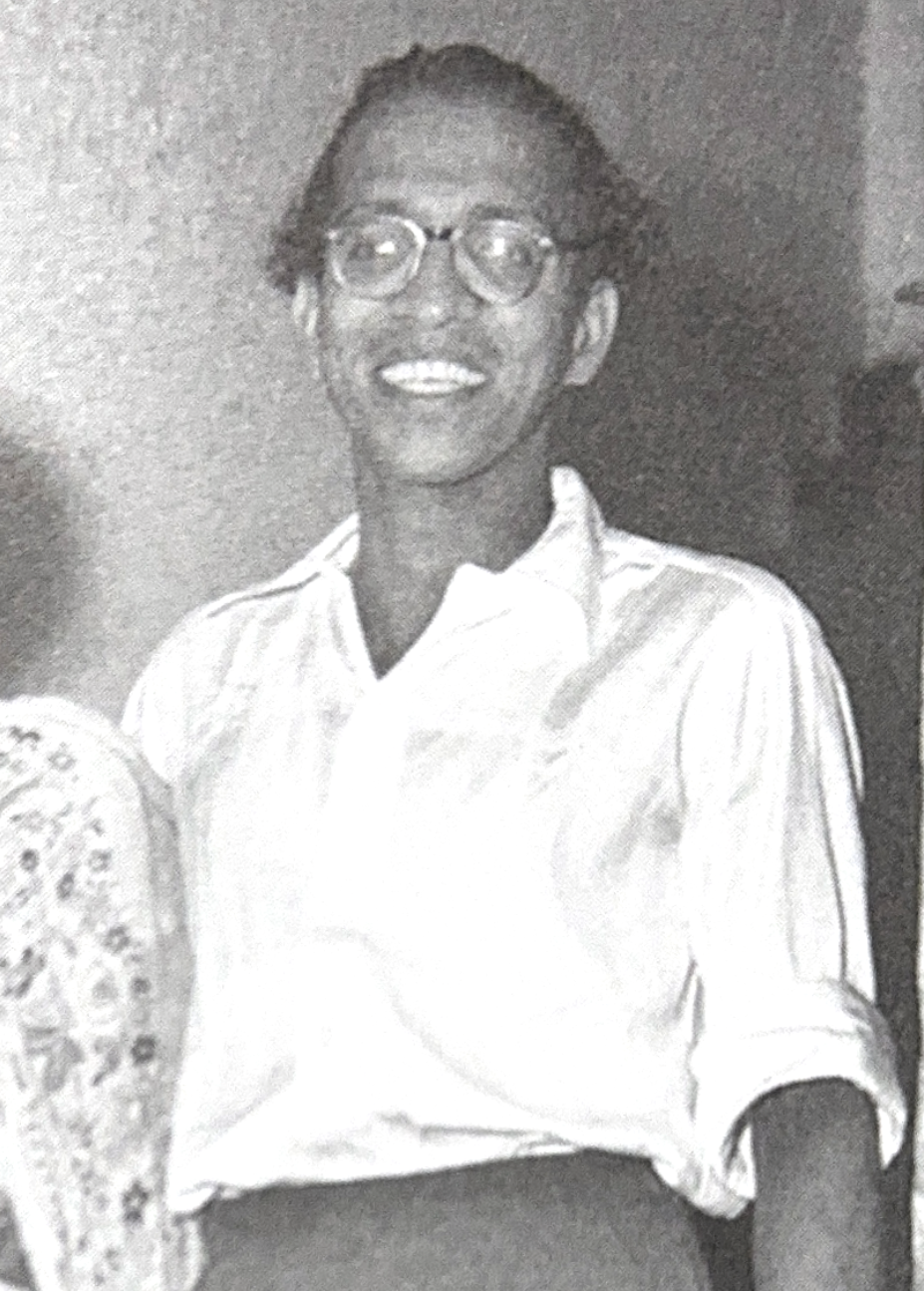
Nominee	Devan Nair
Party	Independent
Electoral vote	58
President before election
Yeoh Ghim Seng (acting)
PAP
Elected President
Devan Nair
Independent

Indirect presidential elections were held in Singapore on 23 October 1981, after the death of the incumbent president Benjamin Sheares.

During the election, 58 members of Parliament were present while 14 members were absent. Devan Nair was elected by the Parliament of Singapore. Nair was sworn in as the third president on 24 October 1981.

== Results ==
Candidate	Party	Votes	%
Devan Nair	Independent	58	100.00
Total		58	100.00
Total votes		58	–
Registered voters/turnout		72	80.56
