= List of national cemeteries =

The following is a partial list of prominent National Cemeteries:

== Africa ==
=== Algeria ===
- El Alia Cemetery, Algiers

=== Burundi ===
- Mausolée des Martyrs de la Démocratie, Bujumbura

=== Ghana ===
- Asomdwee Park, Accra
- Burma Camp Military Cemetery, Accra

=== Liberia ===
- Palm Grove Cemetery, Monrovia (former)

=== Zimbabwe ===
- National Heroes' Acre, Harare

== Asia ==
=== China ===
- Babaoshan Revolutionary Cemetery, Beijing

=== Indonesia ===
- Kalibata Heroes' Cemetery, Jakarta
- Giri Tunggal Heroes' Cemetery, Semarang
- Kusumanegara Heroes' Cemetery, Yogyakarta

=== Iran ===
- Behesht-e Zahra, Tehran

=== Israel ===
- Mount Herzl, Jerusalem

=== Japan ===
- Chidorigafuchi National Cemetery, Tokyo

=== Laos ===
- Laotian National Revolutionary Cemetery, Xaythany district, Vientiane

=== Malaysia ===
- Taman Selatan, Putrajaya
- Makam Pahlawan, Kuala Lumpur

=== Mongolia ===
- Altan-Ölgii National Cemetery, Ulan Bator

=== North Korea ===
- Cemetery of Fallen Fighters of the KPA, Pyongyang
- Fatherland Liberation War Martyrs Cemetery, Pyongyang
- Revolutionary Martyrs' Cemetery, Taesŏng-guyŏk, Pyongyang
- Patriotic Martyrs' Cemetery, Hyŏngjesan-guyŏk, Pyongyang

=== Philippines ===
- Libingan ng mga Bayani, Metro Manila

=== Singapore ===
- Kranji State Cemetery
- Kranji War Cemetery
- Mandai Crematorium and Columbarium

=== South Korea ===
- Daejeon National Cemetery, Daejeon
- Seoul National Cemetery, Seoul
- April 19th National Cemetery, Seoul
- March 15th National Cemetery, Changwon
- May 18th National Cemetery, Gwangju
- United Nations Memorial Cemetery, Busan – dedicated to United Nations Command casualties of the Korean War
- Yeongcheon National Cemetery, Yeongcheon

=== Taiwan ===
- National Revolutionary Martyrs' Shrine, Taipei
- Wuzhi Mountain Military Cemetery, New Taipei

=== Thailand ===
- Royal Cemetery at Wat Ratchabophit, Bangkok

=== Turkey ===
- Turkish State Cemetery, Ankara

=== Vietnam ===
- Mai Dich Cemetery, Hanoi

== Europe ==
=== Albania ===
- National Martyrs' Cemetery of Albania, Tirana

=== Armenia ===
- Komitas Pantheon, Yerevan

=== Azerbaijan ===
- Alley of Honor, Baku

=== Croatia ===
- Mirogoj Cemetery, Zagreb

=== Czech Republic ===
- Vyšehrad Cemetery, Prague

=== Denmark ===
- Roskilde Cathedral, Roskilde

=== France ===
- Paris Pantheon, Paris

Note: A former church, not a proper cemetery

=== Finland ===
- Hietaniemi cemetery, Helsinki

=== Georgia ===
- Mtatsminda Pantheon, Tbilisi

=== Greece ===
- First Cemetery of Athens, Athens

=== Hungary ===
- Fiumei Road National Graveyard, Budapest
- Farkasréti Cemetery, Budapest

=== Ireland ===
- Arbour Hill Cemetery, Dublin
- Glasnevin Cemetery, Dublin

=== Italy ===
- Santa Croce, Florence

Note: A church, not a proper cemetery

=== Poland ===
- Powązki Cemetery, Warsaw
- Powązki Military Cemetery, Warsaw

=== Portugal ===
- Church of Santa Engrácia, Lisbon

Note: A church, not a proper cemetery

=== Russia ===
- Kremlin Wall Necropolis, Moscow
- Federal Military Memorial Cemetery, Moscow

=== Slovakia ===
- National Cemetery, Martin

=== Turkey ===
- Turkish State Cemetery, Ankara

=== Ukraine ===
- Baikove Cemetery, Kyiv

== North America ==
=== Canada ===
- Beechwood Cemetery, Ottawa

=== Cuba ===
- Santa Ifigenia Cemetery, Santiago de Cuba
- Mausoleo del II Frente Oriental, Santiago de Cuba
- Mausoleo del III Frente Oriental, Santiago de Cuba

=== Dominican Republic ===
- Altar de la Patria
- National Pantheon of the Dominican Republic

=== El Salvador ===
- Cemetery of Distinguished Citizens, San Salvador

=== Guatemala ===
- Guatemala City General Cemetery

=== Haiti ===
- National Cemetery, Port-au-Prince

=== Honduras ===
- Cementerio General, Trujillo

=== Jamaica ===
- National Heroes Park

=== Mexico ===
- Panteón de San Fernando
- Mexico City National Cemetery, Mexico City (established and maintained by the American Battle Monuments Commission for American servicemembers)
- Rotunda of Illustrious Persons

=== Nicaragua ===
- Cementerio General Occidental, Managua

=== Puerto Rico ===
Puerto Rico National Cemetery, Bayamón

=== United States ===
- United States National Cemetery (full listing)
  - Arlington National Cemetery, Virginia

== Oceania ==
=== Australia ===
- Rookwood Cemetery, Sydney
- Melbourne General Cemetery, Melbourne

== South America ==
=== Argentina ===
- La Recoleta Cemetery, Buenos Aires
- La Chacarita cemetery, Buenos Aires

=== Bolivia ===
- General Cemetery of Santa Cruz
- Cementerio General de Cochabamba

=== Brazil ===
- Cemitério de São João Batista, Rio de Janeiro

=== Chile ===
- Altar de la Patria of Chile.
- Cementerio General de Santiago, Chile.

=== Colombia ===
- Central Cemetery of Bogotá, Bogotá

=== Ecuador ===
- San Diego Cemetery, Quito
- Guayaquil General Cemetery, Guayaquil

=== Paraguay ===
- National Pantheon of the Heroes, Asunción
- Recoleta Cemetery, Asuncion

=== Peru ===
- Presbitero Maestro Cemetery, Lima
- Panteón de los Próceres, Lima

=== Uruguay ===
- Central Cemetery of Montevideo

=== Venezuela ===
- National Pantheon of Venezuela, Caracas

== See also ==
- American Battle Monuments Commission, which maintains cemeteries for American war dead outside of the United States
- Commonwealth War Graves Commission, which maintains cemeteries for British Commonwealth war dead outside of the United Kingdom
- Lists of cemeteries
