= Puan Noor Aishah =

First Lady of Singapore from 1965 to 1970

Her Excellency Toh Puan Noor Aishah Mohammad Salim PBC
- Noor Aishah in the 1960s

First Lady of Singapore
- In role 9 August 1965 – 23 November 1970
- President: Yusof Ishak
- Preceded by: Position established
- Succeeded by: Yeo Seh Geok

Personal details
- Born: Noor Aishah binti Mohammad Salim; 21 May 1933 Selangor, Federated Malay States, British Malaya
- Died: 22 April 2025 (aged 91) Singapore
- Resting place: Kranji State Cemetery
- Spouse: Yusof Ishak (m. 1949; died 1970)
- Children: 3
- Parent(s): Mohammad Salim Jusoh (father); Fatimah Ali (mother)

Noor Aishah binti Mohammad Salim PBC (21 May 1933 – 22 April 2025), commonly known as Puan Noor Aishah, was the wife of Yusof Ishak, the first president of Singapore. She took the role as First Lady of Singapore between 1965 and 1970.

== Background ==
Noor Aishah was born in Selangor on 21 May 1933, and was adopted by Mohammad Salim Jusoh (born Barney Perkins) and Fatimah Ali. She grew up in a village in Penang, completing only two years of primary school due to the interruptions of World War II.

Aged only 16, she married Yusof Ishak, 23 years her senior, on 20 November 1949. The two met three days before the wedding, having been introduced through a mutual acquaintance. After marrying in Penang, she returned with Yusof to Singapore. The couple had three children.

She and her husband undertook the Hajj in 1963, while on a state visit to Saudi Arabia.

She was known to frequently wear the kebaya.

Noor Aishah died at the Singapore General Hospital on 22 April 2025, at the age of 91. Her death was announced by Prime Minister Lawrence Wong. Her body was brought to Ba’alwie Mosque for the funeral prayers (Jenazah), before being interred at the Kranji State Cemetery with her husband, Yusof Ishak. She was accorded a State assisted funeral.

== Other roles ==
=== In The Istana ===
While living in The Istana, Noor Aishah taught the English-trained chefs more local recipes, including "beef rendang, epok epok and various kuih". Her "star dish" was sago gula melaka pudding, but she was also noted for her nasi ulam.

In order to better host foreign dignitaries and their wives, she took English classes. After a year, she was offering speeches in English at state functions.

When her husband's health began declining in his third term, she began to help with his social responsibilities, such as presenting the 1968 National Day Awards.

=== Patronages ===
Noor Aishah was patron of the Singapore Red Cross, the Young Women's Muslim Association, and the Girl Guides Association.

Noor Aisha was a patron of Masjid Yusof Ishak in Woodlands, whose construction was announced in 2014. She donated some plants from her nursery for the mosque's landscaping. Following its opening in 2017, she appeared at many of the mosque's events.

==== Girl Guides ====
Noor Aishah became the first Asian president of the Singapore Girl Guides Association (now Girl Guides Singapore) in 1959. In 1965, she became the patron of the movement. She was awarded the Laurel Leaf, the highest award of the Singapore Girl Guides' Association, in 1970.

Veteran Guiding leaders credit her with helping to raise funds for the movement when funding was scarce, and with helping to secure a plot of land for their headquarters in the Clemenceau area in the 1960s. The Girl Guides named the Puan Noor Aishah Award after her.

== Awards and accolades ==
Noor Aishah was awarded the Pingat Bakti Chemerlang (Distinguished Service Medal; later replaced by the Darjah Utama Bakti Cemerlang, or Distinguished Service Order) in 1964 for her work in social welfare.

In 1971, she received an honorary degree from the National University of Singapore, the first Malay woman to do so.

In 2018, she was inducted into Singapore Women's Hall of Fame for her contributions to society.
