= Solamalay Namasivayam =

Singaporean artist (1926–2013)

S. Namasivayam
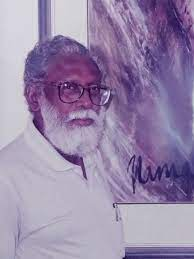
- Born: Namasivayam S/O K. A. Solamalay; 6 May 1926; Madras, India
- Died: 5 December 2013 (aged 87); Singapore
- Education: National Art School (formerly East Sydney Technical College)
- Known for: Figurative art, figure drawing, figure painting

Solamalay Namasivayam (6 May 1926 – 5 December 2013) was a Singaporean artist, lecturer and educator who worked primarily in life drawing and figure study. He was also a founding member of the elite Singaporean Art Group, Group 90, and a leading proponent to the development of figurative art in Singapore.

== Biography ==
Born the eldest child of nine siblings to a land owning family in India's old Madras Presidency, Namasivayam left his hometown at the age of 5 with his mother to join his father who was employed by the Central Electricity Board as a foreman-mechanic in Kuala Lumpur, Malaya. Resettling in his new home at the Board's accommodation quarters in Bangsa Road (present-day Petaling Jaya), 6-year-old Namasivayam briefly attended a private school in the Brickfields vicinity run by the Young Men's Christian Association (YMCA). He was later transferred to a government Primary School at Batu Road, KL, after being recommended by a British engineer working with the Board, who spotted potential in him. It was here that the young Namasivayam first discovered his love for art, aided and nurtured by the encouragement of his teachers, who quickly noticed his natural aptitude for the subject. In 1939, he gained admission into KL's Victoria Institution, Malaya's premier Boys' school for his secondary education. There he gained a reputation amongst his classmates as a consummate sketcher, drawing constantly in between lessons, and excelling at the art lessons he was exposed to.

In 1942, war came to Southeast Asia and his education was disrupted by the Japanese occupation of Malaya. When his father was transferred to work in Butterworth, Penang by the Japanese, Namasivayam continued his studies at a Japanese school in Prai town in Butterworth for 18 months before he was deployed to work as an engine mechanic at the local Japanese-controlled Railway Station. In 1943 the 17-year-old was press-ganged by the military authorities into working as a translator on the infamous Thailand-Burma Railway. where he experienced many personal hardships, near- death experiences and witnessed many untold horrors and atrocities.

After the Japanese surrender in 1945, he made the arduous journey southwards on foot and railway from Siam to Malaya, where he had an emotional reunion with his family who thought he had perished during the war. He resumed his studies at Victoria Institution to complete his secondary education, where he also rediscovered his passion for art, depicting landscape scenes mainly with pencil and on occasions with watercolour. In 1947, at the age of 21 he completed his Senior Cambridge examinations at the Institution., and sought employment with a French oil palm plantation company called Socfin, as a laboratory assistant.

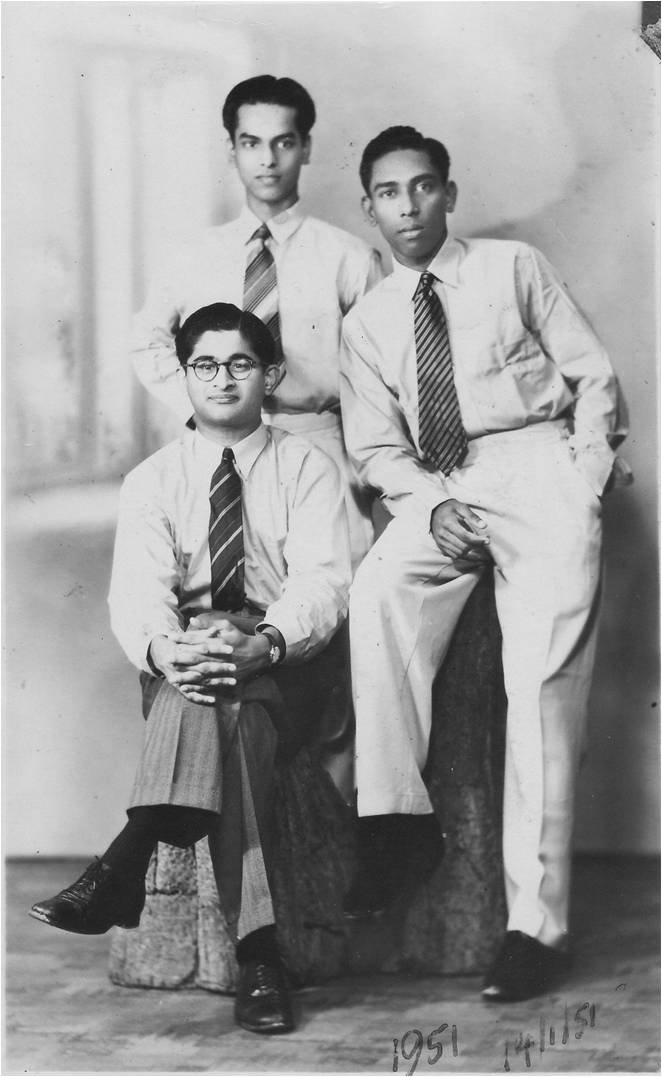

In 1950, Namasivayam headed south to Singapore in search of greener pastures, and enrolled himself at the Teachers' Training College, where they sent him as a trainee teacher to Tanjong Rhu Primary School. In 1954, he successfully passed out with National Training Certificate Diploma, and proceeded to teach at various schools as a primary school teacher. At Trafalgar Primary School, he was given his first opportunity to focus on teaching art. The then-Primary School principal Ms Tan Chee Chee gave Namasivayam full play in the development of the school arts programme, and through his guidance, his students won first place in art competitions held at Victoria Memorial Hall. In 1956, in accordance with family traditions, Namasivayam travelled to India to tie the knot in an arranged marriage. He then returned to Singapore with his new bride, Lakshmi, and resumed his teaching career.

In 1957, Mr.Namasivayam's love and proficiency for teaching art came to the notice of Mr Goh Kong Beng, president of the Singapore Teachers' Union who subsequently recommended him for an art scholarship in Australia. He declined at first but eventually accepted it after being encouraged by other teachers in the School. Namasivayam eventually received the Colombo Plan Scholarship award to study art, along with four other trainee teachers Inche Suri Bin Mohyani, Chew Fook Chun, Seah Teow Puan and Sim Tong Khern, and left for Sydney on 11 March 1957. Upon graduation, Namasivayam returned to Singapore in August 1961.

Upon his return he taught at various schools including Crescent Girls' School and Gan Eng Seng School. He was duly promoted to Lecturer at the Teachers' Training College and later, Senior Media Specialist at the Ministry of Education. In 1987 after retiring from the Ministry of Education, he was invited to take on the post as an art lecturer with the LASALLE College of the Arts.

Namasivayam died in Singapore on 5 December 2013, at the age of 87.
