= Group 90 =

Singaporean informal arts group

Group 90 is an informal arts group in Singapore, committed to the study and interpretation, and promotion of the human nudity as an art form. It was founded the late Brother Joseph McNally, along with founding members S. Namasivayam, Chia Wai Hon and Sim Tong Khern, who subscribe to the European art tradition of using the human body in developing artistic mastery in depicting form, perceptual acuity and fluency in drawing.

== History ==
Before 1987, Singapore had no avenues for expressing nude in art. Neither Nanyang Academy of Fine Arts nor the Lasalle-SIA College of the Arts offered life drawing classes, and the conservative Singapore art market did not favour nude-themed art for fear of offending those with an aversion for nudity. Only a few artists favoured the depiction of human figure in art, such as Liu Kang, Cheong Soo Pieng, Ng Eng Teng, and contemporary artist Yeo Siak Goon; other artists in Singapore generally favoured landscape art. Even in street scenes, they tried to avoid painting human figures in the scenes. Chia also attributed the lack of interest to the difficult of mastering the discipline, and especially the few models willing to pose in the nude.

Unafazed by negative perceptions, Brother Joseph McNally in 1987 decided to introduce life drawing and painting from a nude model into the College art curriculum. He appreciated the immense value of knowledge of human anatomy to good draughtsmanship, and urged the then-College art lecturer S. Namaysivayam to instill good foundation training to the students of the College through the subject. Namasivayam, who himself had not drawn a life model since his art school days in the 1950s, was uncertain about his ability to teach the subject well. Unable to afford hiring a model on his own to practice drawing, he contacted his artist friends whom he knew would be keen to join him. Sim, Chia and fellow Lasalle lecturer Loh Khee Yew, along with artists like Ong Chye Cho, Chew Yew Seng and Keong Hean Keng heeded his call.

This group of artists and amateurs met at a drawing studio in the old Lasalle-SIA College of the Arts Telok Kurau campus on Saturdays, with support from the College administration. For the first time in history, this gathering provided opportunities for enthusiasts to study the human body live from a posed model. It also enabled exchanging of ideas on figurative art between members. Group 90 later shifted their weekly drawing sessions to the Stamford Arts Centre on Waterloo Street, and later to LaSalle's premises on Goodman Road. The group continued to grow and attract art enthusiasts like former chairman of the Lam Soon Group, T. C. Whang, and Sir Roy Calne who shared the same passion for artistic expression of the human nudity through painting and drawing mediums. Professional artists like the late Dr Earl Lu, Liu Kang, and the late Dr Ng Eng Teng joined the Group in 1991.

== Figurama art show ==
On 15 March 1991, the art group opened their first public artshow Figurama, organised by the Nrityalaya Aesthetics Society at the gallery of the Nanyang Academy of Fine Arts. This exhibition featured 82 paintings of female nudes by 14 artists, created during the weekly sessions at the Stamford Arts Centre. Figurama was the first show of its kind in the history of Singapore art. The works on display impressed visitors, and received good reviews from art critics. Art historian T.K. Sabapathy commended on the excellent quality of the works, and their bold expressions It was also at the opening of the show that the group officially adopted the name 'Group 90'. Since then, the group has continued to hold figurative art exhibitions of works by its members once every two years. Each artshow by the group in the succeeding years has demonstrated not only their commitment to the study of the nude, but also the flowering of various ideas and techniques in different media. Namasivayam, for example, expresses explosive dynamism and 'Michelangelesque' rendering in his charcoal / pastel drawings. Ng Eng Teng in contrast, expresses with 'silent potency' to achieve a sensual yet strong sculptural form; a reflection to his bronze sculpture works that Ng is known for. Founder-member Loh Kee Yew's free flowing lines exude a Zen-like flow in his thoughts, demonstrating high level of mastery with the ink and pen that is characteristic of his works.

The exhibition Nuphoria held in the year 2000, generated interest and responses from both the local press and the public. Among the viewers attending that artshow, students from junior colleges and Polytechnic were seen sketching the artworks on display, interacting and fielding questions to the artists present at the show. This unprecedented public interest in nude art broke the taboo associated with the art form – something that the Group had hoped for since their inception.

== Members ==
- Chia Wai Hon
- Choy Weng Yang
- Earl Lu
- Joseph McNally
- Liu Kang
- Ng Eng Teng
- Roy Calne
- S. Namasivayam

== Major exhibitions ==
Dates	Title	Location
15 March - 16 March 1991	Figurama	Nanyang Academy of Fine Arts (NAFA) Gallery; Singapore
18 March - 22 March 1992	The Figure in Art in the Singapore Context	Nanyang Academy of Fine Arts (NAFA) Gallery; Singapore
17 March - 19 March 1994	ART of the Nude	Nanyang Academy of Fine Arts (NAFA) Gallery; Singapore
17 July - 21 March 1998	Image Nude	Orchard Point Exhibition Hall; Singapore
14 April - 19 April 2000	Nuphoria 2000	The Gallery @ The Paragon; Singapore
18 December – 24 December 2002	nuSense: An exhibition of drawings and paintings of the nude by members of Group 90	Nanyang Academy of Fine Arts (NAFA) Gallery; Singapore
8 February – 14 February 2008	Nuspiration	Bhaskar's Arts Academy; Singapore
