= 1974 Singaporean presidential election =

Presidential election in Singapore

← 1970	6 November 1974	1978 →
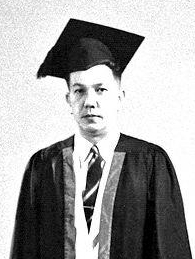
Nominee	Benjamin Sheares
Party	Independent
Electoral vote	59
President before election
Benjamin Sheares
Independent
Elected President
Benjamin Sheares
Independent

Indirect presidential elections were held in Singapore on 6 November 1974.

The election took place during a sitting of Parliament on 6 November 1974 where 59 members were present and 6 members were absent. Prime Minister Lee Kuan Yew nominated Benjamin Sheares for a second term as president. Sheares was unanimously re-elected by Parliament as president. Sheares was sworn in for his second four-year term as president on 2 January 1975.

== Results ==
Candidate	Party	Votes	%
Benjamin Sheares	Independent	59	100.00
Total		59	100.00
Total votes		59	–
Registered voters/turnout		65	90.77
