= Kranji State Cemetery =

Cemetery in Singapore

- Interactive map of Kranji State Cemetery

Details
- Location: Singapore
- Country: Singapore
- Coordinates: 1°25′10″N 103°45′26″E
- Type: National
- Owned by: National Environment Agency
- No. of graves: 3
- Find a Grave: Kranji State Cemetery

The Kranji State Cemetery (Chinese: 克兰芝国家公墓; Malay: Tanah Perkuburan Negara Kranji; Tamil: கிராஞ்சி மாநில கல்லறையில்) is a national cemetery of Singapore, located at Kranji near Kranji War Cemetery in northwestern Singapore.

With an area of 2 acres (8,100 m^{2}), the Kranji State Cemetery is reserved for the burial of persons who have made a significant contribution to Singapore, and is maintained by the National Environment Agency. War graves sections are maintained by the Commonwealth War Graves Commission.

== Notable burials ==
- Yusof Ishak (1910 - 1970), 1st President of Singapore (1965 - 1970)
- Benjamin Sheares (1907 - 1981), 2nd President of Singapore (1971 - 1981)
- Puan Noor Aishah (1933 - 2025), First Lady of Singapore, wife of Yusof Ishak

== See also ==
- Death in Singapore
- Former cemeteries in Singapore
- Mandai Crematorium and Columbarium – resting place of ordinary Singaporeans as well as several presidents, senior cabinet ministers, as well as former Prime Minister Lee Kuan Yew and his wife Kwa Geok Choo
