= Choy Weng Yang =

Singaporean artist, curator and arts writer (1930–2025)

- 蔡荣恩
- Choy in 2008
- Born: 12 July 1930; Singapore, Straits Settlements, British Malaya
- Died: 7 August 2025 (aged 95); Queenstown, Singapore
- Education: Hornsey College of Art
- Known for: Oil painting, drawing
- Movement: Postmodern art, abstract expressionism
- Awards: 1973: UNESCO Fellowship in Creative Arts-survey of Contemporary American art and research on environment arts at the MIT Center for Advanced Visual Studies; 1979: Cultural tour by invitation of the Government of India; 1985: Cultural tour by invitation of the Government of France

Choy Weng Yang (12 July 1930 – 7 August 2025; simplified Chinese: 蔡荣恩; traditional Chinese: 蔡榮恩; pinyin: Cài Róngén) was a Singaporean visual artist, curator and writer on the a artd, and proponent of the art fraternity in post-independence Singapore. His literary contributions on post-modern arts in Singapore have helped shape the local contemporary art scene.

== Life and career ==
Born 12 July 1930 in Singapore, Choy graduated with a National Diploma of Art UK from Hornsey College of Art in 1962 and received the Art Teachers' Certificate (UK) from the University of London Institute of Education in 1963. In his years as a student in London, he had many opportunities to study the works of great modern artists like Picasso and Mondrian, through visits to other European cities. These opportunities to travel shaped his knowledge of art and his aesthetic development for his art in the years that were to come.

Back in Singapore after graduating from the Institute, Choy worked as assistant lecturer in the Arts & Crafts Department of the Teachers' Training College, and subsequently took office as a Curator of Art with the National Museum of Singapore in 1978. In his professional capacity he served actively for the arts circle, receiving acclamation for his art criticisms for artists and writings about local artistic movements. Choy's passion for painting never left him despite his heavy work commitments, and actively participated in group art shows in Australia and Paris. In 1982, Choy contributed to an article on Singapore art, and published in the very first Singapore art directory, titled "Singaporean artists". This book was officially launched at the 1982 National Day Art Exhibition, by the then Minister of State for Culture, Major Fong Sip Chee, on 16 August 1982.

His exposures to western art during his curatorship tenure enabled him to develop his artistic side. In the early years he was particularly influenced by the works by Monet, for the light and colour in his paintings. Progressively he found that using light and colour alone on his canvas was not enough in his own compositions. Cézanne's use of structure in his composition, and Mondrian's strength in order, clarity and strong composition design thus became an important elements in Choy's paintings from 1985 on. It was also in the same year that Choy decided to retire from his curatorial position to devote himself as a full-time painter. In the 1990s, Choy's works are increasingly influenced by Chinese ink and wash paintings by the great Chinese masters of bygone dynasties.

In the years that followed after his retirement, Choy continued to be active in the arts scene. Choy's curatorial experience continued to be sought after by many art aficionados and artists alike, and frequently penned art criticisms and introductions of artists for their exhibitions and art publications.

Choy died at Alexandra Hospital on 7 August 2025, at the age of 95.

== Major exhibitions ==
Dates	Title	Location
1972	Singapore Art – Adelaide Festival of Arts	Adelaide, Australia
1976	National Museum Art Gallery Inaugural Exhibition (group exhibition)	National Museum of Singapore; Singapore
12 September - 15 September 1979	Contemporaries '79 (group exhibition)	Alpha Gallery; Singapore
1981	ASEAN Traveling Exhibition of Painting and Photography (group exhibition)	
1985	Singaporean Artist – Salon des Artistes Francais	Grand Palais; Paris, France
1985	ASEAN Traveling Exhibition of Painting and Photography (group exhibition)	
1987	New Directions (group exhibition)	National Museum of Singapore Art Gallery; Singapore
1988	Singapore Contemporary Artists	Hong Kong Art Centre; Hong Kong
1990	Brun-Sin Singapore (group exhibition)	Takashimaya Gallery; Singapore
1991	Brun-Sin Singapore (group exhibition)	Takashimaya Gallery; Singapore
1992	The Figure in Art in the Singapore Context (2nd group exhibition by Group 90)	Nanyang Academy of Fine Arts (NAFA) Gallery; Singapore
17 March - 19 March 1994	ART of the Nude (3rd group exhibition by Group 90)	Nanyang Academy of Fine Arts (NAFA) Gallery; Singapore
1995	Art That Blinds	Edmund Tie & Company; Singapore
1995	Art and Business, presented by Shenn's Fine Art organised by Gim Ng	Takashimaya Gallery; Singapore
1996	Line Perceptions – recent drawings by 6 artists (group exhibition)	Cicada Gallery; Singapore
1998	Windows – paintings by 3 Singaporean artists (group exhibition)	Art Forum; Singapore
2000	Ambience – theme and variations (solo)	DP. Space; Singapore
2002	The Contemporary Asian Art Fair (group exhibition) organized by the Art Association	Suntec City; Singapore
2004	City Inspirations	Cape of Good Hope Art Gallery; Singapore
2005	ARTSingapore	Suntec City; Singapore
2006	ARTSingapore	Suntec City; Singapore
2007	ARTSingapore	Suntec City; Singapore
2007	Unique 9 Exhibition (group exhibition)	Cape of Good Hope Art Gallery; Singapore
