= 1978 Singaporean presidential election =

Presidential election in Singapore

← 1974	29 December 1978	1981 →
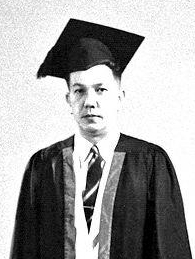
Nominee	Benjamin Sheares
Party	Independent
Electoral vote	59
President before election
Benjamin Sheares
Independent
Elected President
Benjamin Sheares
Independent

Indirect presidential elections were held in Singapore on 29 December 1978.

A total of 59 members of Parliament were present at the election while nine members were absent. Benjamin Sheares was re-elected by the Parliament of Singapore. Sheares was sworn in for his third term as president on 30 December 1978.

== Results ==
Candidate	Party	Votes	%
Benjamin Sheares	Independent	59	100.00
Total		59	100.00
Total votes		59	–
Registered voters/turnout		68	86.76
