= KKh 060 =

Galaxy in the constellation Leo

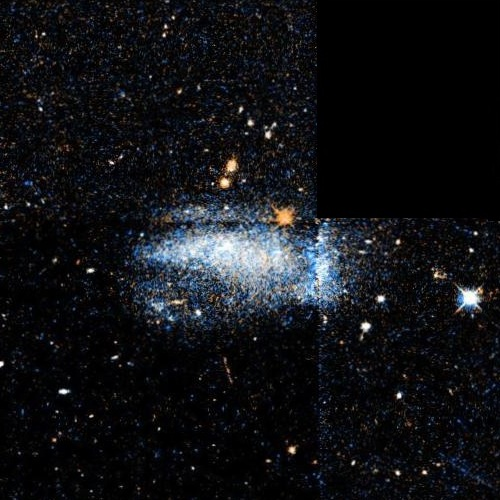
- KKh 060

Observation data (J2000 epoch)
- Constellation: Leo
- Right ascension: 10^{h} 15^{m} 59.39^{s}
- Declination: +06° 48′ 17″
- Redshift: 0,000954
- Distance: 84.2 Mly (25.8 Mpc)

Characteristics
- Type: Irr

Other designations
- SDSS J101559.39+064821.3, AGC 201993, PGC 2807134, LEDA 2807134

KKH 060 is an irregular galaxy and a low surface brightness galaxy located in the direction of the constellation Leo at a distance of 84.2 million light years from Earth. The galaxy was thought to be close to the Local Group, but is actually a field galaxy, very far from it.
