= 1985 Singaporean presidential election =

Presidential election in Singapore

← 1981	30 August 1985	1989 →
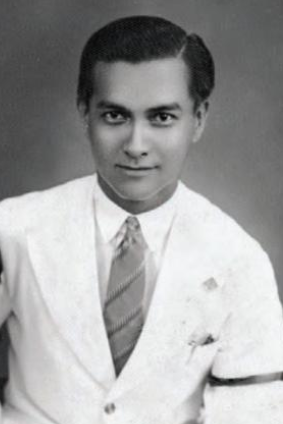
Nominee	Wee Kim Wee
Party	Independent
Electoral vote	73
President before election
Yeoh Ghim Seng (acting)
PAP
Elected President
Wee Kim Wee
Independent

Indirect presidential elections were held in Singapore on 30 August 1985, following the resignation of the incumbent, Devan Nair.

During the election, 73 members of Parliament were present and five members were absent. Wee Kim Wee was elected by the Parliament of Singapore. Wee was sworn in as the fourth president on 2 September 1985.

== Results ==
Candidate	Party	Votes	%
Wee Kim Wee	Independent	73	100.00
Total		73	100.00
Total votes		73	–
Registered voters/turnout		78	93.59
