= Spouse of the president of Singapore =

Informal but accepted political title

Spouse of the President of Singapore
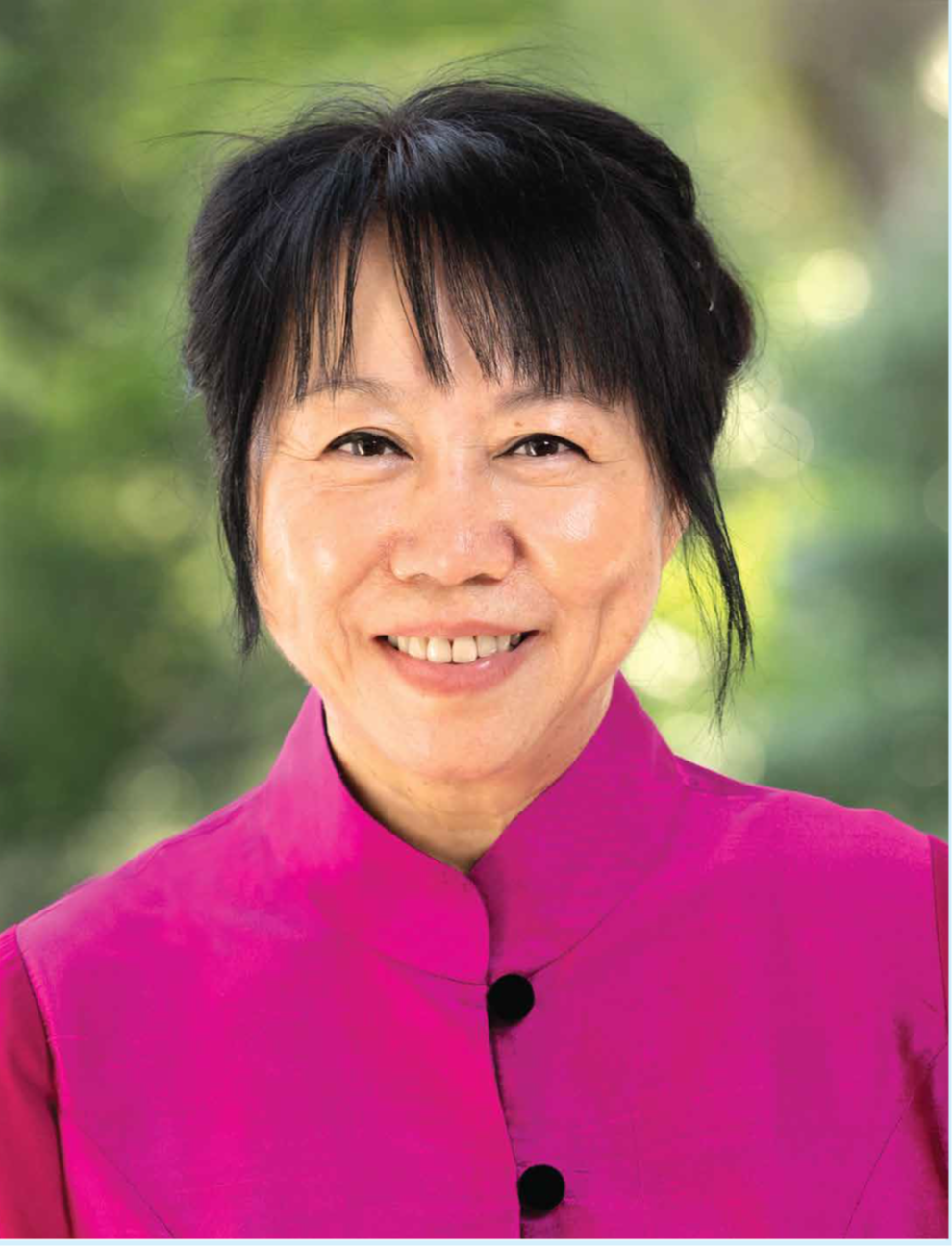
- Incumbent; Jane Yumiko Ittogi since 14 September 2023
- Residence: The Istana
- Inaugural holder: Noor Aishah
- Formation: 9 August 1965; 61 years ago
- Website: Official website

The spouse of the president of Singapore, (Note: Malay: Pasangan Presiden Republik Singapura, Chinese: 新加坡共和国总统配偶; pinyin: Xīnjiāpō Gònghéguó Zǒngtǒng Pèi'ǒu) sometimes referred to as the first lady or first gentleman, is a title typically held by the wife or husband of the president of Singapore, concurrent with the president's term in office. A courtesy term not enshrined in the Constitution, the spouse's role has never been codified or officially defined, but nevertheless figures prominently in the political and social life of Singapore.

By tradition, an official portrait of the spouse of the president of Singapore is prominently displayed in government buildings and public institutions alongside the portrait of the president. Jane Yumiko Ittogi is currently the spouse of the ninth President of Singapore, after her husband Tharman Shanmugaratnam won the 2023 presidential election with 70% of the valid votes.

== History ==
In December 1959, Noor Aishah, wife of President Yusof Ishak, became the first person to assume the role at the age of 26. Her biography, Puan Noor Aishah: Singapore's First Lady, was published in 2017.

On 14 September 2017, Mohammed Abdullah Alhabshee became the first gentleman, after his wife Halimah Yacob won the 2017 presidential election by an uncontested walkover.

== List of spouses of the presidents of Singapore ==
No	Portrait	Spouse of the President	President	Start date	End date	Ref
1		Puan Noor Aishah (1933–2025)	Yusof Ishak	9 August 1965	23 November 1970	
2		Yeo Seh Geok (1917–2012)	Benjamin Sheares	2 January 1971	12 May 1981	
3		Avadai Dhanam Lakshimi (1925–2005)	Devan Nair	23 October 1981	28 March 1985	
4		Koh Sok Hiong (1916–2018)	Wee Kim Wee	2 September 1985	1 September 1993	
5		Ling Siew May (1937–1999)	Ong Teng Cheong	2 September 1993	30 July 1999	
6		Urmila "Umi" Nandey (born 1929)	Sellapan Ramanathan	1 September 1999	31 August 2011	
7		Mary Chee Bee Kiang (born 1941)	Tony Tan Keng Yam	1 September 2011	31 August 2017	
8		Mohammed Abdullah Alhabshee	Halimah Yacob	14 September 2017	14 September 2023	
9		Jane Yumiko Ittogi	Tharman Shanmugaratnam	14 September 2023	Incumbent	

== See also ==
- President of Singapore
