= Leslie Lam (doctor) =

Singaporean cardiologist

- Born: 1942 (age 83–84)
- Education: National University of Ireland; University College, Dublin
- Scientific career
- Fields: Cardiology
- Workplaces: Singapore General Hospital; Academy of Medicine in Singapore, Farrer Park Medical Centre

Leslie Lam (born 1942) is a Singaporean cardiologist.

== Early life and education ==
Lam completed his secondary school education at St Joseph's Institution, Blackrock College, and the National University of Ireland. He then went on to get his Bachelor of Medicine (MB), Bachelor of Surgery (BCh), and Bachelor of Obstetrics (BAO) in 1967 and his Bachelor of Science (Pharmacology) BSc (Hons) in 1969 at the University College, Dublin, Ireland. He then went on to attain a Diploma in Child Health (DCH) at University College, Dublin, working extensively with Professor Eoin O'Brien, Professor Conor Ward, and Professor Sean Blake.

== Career and research ==
In 1982, Lam returned to Singapore and was appointed as the Senior Registrar and then Consultant in Cardiology at Singapore General Hospital. He later became a fellow at the Royal College of Physicians in Ireland and a fellow at the Academic of Medicine in Singapore in 1987. In 2001, Lam was the first doctor in Singapore to conduct an Enhanced External Counterpulsation for coronary artery disease in Singapore.

In 1987, Lam published the first important paper on Thallium-201 Myocardial Stress Imaging.

In 1988, Lam published the first case of Percutaneous Transluminal Coronary Angioplasty (PTCA).

In 2017, Lam was cleared of all allegations of professional misconduct after a complaint had been lodged with the Singapore Medical Council in 2012. The complainant claimed that Lam had not obtained informed consent before carrying out a percutaneous coronary intervention in 2011. In 2017, Lam was cleared of all charges, following an appeal to the High Court.

He is currently a Consultant Cardiologist at Farrer Park Medical Centre, since 2018.

== Volunteer work ==
Since 1979, Lam has been involved in volunteer work in the Southeast Asian region. He volunteered with Vietnamese refugees in Dublin in 1979. Since 1991, he has led teams of doctors to Myanmar, Brunei, and the Seychelles, offering services and surgeries for free. Since 1993, he has been an Honorary Consultant with the Ministry of Health in Myanmar. Since 1997, he has been a Visiting Consultant to the Republic of Seychelles and since 1991, has served as the physician to the Sultan of Brunei.

In 2012, Lam partnered with Professor Eoin O' Brien, creating the O'Brien Lam collection, collating Irish literature and history, composed of correspondences, papers, and memorabilia relating to Samuel Beckett, Nevill Johnson, Timothy Smiddy, and Brian O'Doherty.

== Awards and honours ==
- 1984 The Most Honorable Order of the Crown of Brunei Dato Paduka Mahkota Brunei Yang Amat Mulia (DPMB)
- 1995 Governor of the Society for Cardiac Angiography and Interventions, USA
- 2005 Honorary Fellow, University College Dublin
- 2014 D.Med Honoris Causa, National University of Ireland
- 2017 UCD MGA Distinguished Graduate, University College, Dublin Ireland
