= Benjamin Sheares =

President of Singapore from 1971 to 1981

Benjamin Sheares DPMK FRCOG FACS
- Sheares officiating the 1973 SEAP Games

2nd President of Singapore
- In office 2 January 1971 – 12 May 1981
- Prime Minister: Lee Kuan Yew
- Preceded by: Yusof Ishak; Yeoh Ghim Seng (acting)
- Succeeded by: Yeoh Ghim Seng (acting); Devan Nair

Personal details
- Born: Benjamin Henry Sheares; 12 August 1907 Singapore, Straits Settlements
- Died: 12 May 1981 (aged 73) Holt Road, Singapore
- Cause of death: Lung cancer
- Resting place: Kranji State Cemetery
- Party: Independent
- Spouse(s): Wong Ah Foon (m. 1931; div. 1947) Yeo Seh Geok (m. 1939)
- Children: 3; including Constance and Joseph
- Education: King Edward VII College of Medicine
- Occupation: Physician; academic

Benjamin Henry Sheares (12 August 1907 – 12 May 1981) was a Singaporean obstetrician, gynaecologist, and academic who served as the second president of Singapore between 1971 until his death in 1981.

Born in Singapore under British rule, Sheares graduated from the King Edward VII College of Medicine in 1929. He specialised in obstetrics and gynaecology and worked at the Singapore General Hospital and Kandang Kerbau Hospital (KKH), eventually serving as the acting professor of obstetrics and gynaecology at the University of Malaya in Singapore. He later became the professor of obstetrics and gynaecology in 1950, becoming the first local to rise to such a position as high-ranking colonial officers were usually appointed instead.

Sheares retired in 1961 due to health complications and went into private practice before being elected as the president of Singapore by parliament following the death of incumbent president Yusof Ishak. Sheares was sworn in on 2 January 1971 following a unanimous agreement by Parliament and served as the president of Singapore for three terms, from 2 January 1971 till his death in office on 12 May 1981. He was succeeded by Devan Nair on 23 October 1981. During his presidency, he officiated multiple events and ceremonies such as the 1971 Commonwealth Heads of Government Meeting and the 1973 South East Asian Peninsular Games.

Regarded as "the father of obstetrics and gynaecology in Singapore", Sheares was known for standardising the lower Caesarian section in Singapore and creating an artificial vagina. The lower Caesarian section has since become the standard procedure in Singapore whilst his method to create an artificial vagina has been dubbed the "Sheares operation" and is used to help women who suffer from birth defects such as vaginal agenesis or in sex-change operations. Sheares remains the only president to have been elected for three terms. Both the Benjamin Sheares Bridge and Sheares Hall at the National University of Singapore (NUS) are named after him.

== Early life and education ==
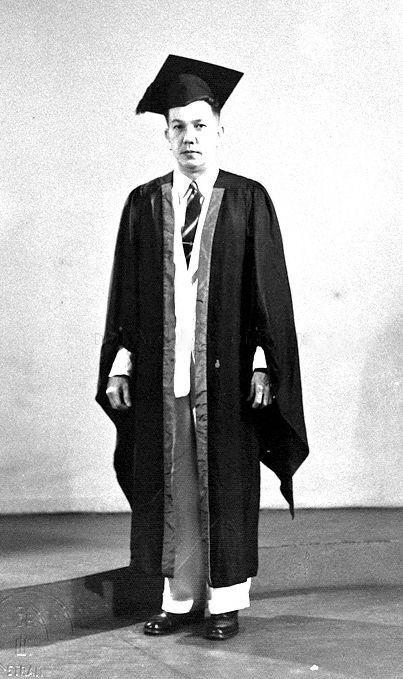
Sheares in the 1940s

Sheares was born on 12 August 1907 in government housing in Singapore, when it was a part of the Straits Settlements, to Edwin Henry and Lilian Jane Sheares (née Gomez). Sheares and his family were Eurasians. Sheares's grandfather was from England but went to India to work with East India Company. According to Sheares's grandmother, her brothers had a dispute with the family, which led them to move out of England and change their surname from "Shears" to "Sheares".

Edwin was born in 1863 in Madras, India. Edwin moved to Penang as a teenager, where he met and married Lilian in 1902; she was born in Singapore and raised in Sumatra, Indonesia. They later moved to Singapore, where Edwin worked as a technical supervisor with the Public Works Department. Edwin and Lilian had six children; they died in 1940 and 1971, respectively.

In his youth, Sheares was known affectionately as Ben or Benny and had showed ambition to become a doctor. His sister Alice encouraged him to follow his dream against his mother's wishes, as she wanted Sheares to start work as a clerk to support the family as soon as he completed his Senior Cambridge examinations (present-day Singapore-Cambridge GCE Ordinary Levels). He attended Methodist Girls' School, when it still allowed mixed-sex education, from 1912 to 1917, following the completion of his Fourth Standard Government Grant in Aid School Examination in 1917. He was then transferred to Saint Andrew's Secondary School in 1918. After four years with Saint Andrew's, he transferred to Raffles Institution in 1922 to study to qualify for the King Edward VII College of Medicine (KECOM).

In 1923, he successfully enrolled at KECOM as a government scholar; the scholarships were provided by the Council of the Medical College. He performed well at KECOM, earning four medals for his results and passing the obstetrics and gynaecology final examination with distinctions. Sheares donated most of the S$50.00 he earned monthly from his scholarship to his mother to support the family. He graduated from KECOM in March 1929 and was among nine graduates sent to work at the Singapore General Hospital (SGH) as their first batch of trainee doctors.

== Medical career ==
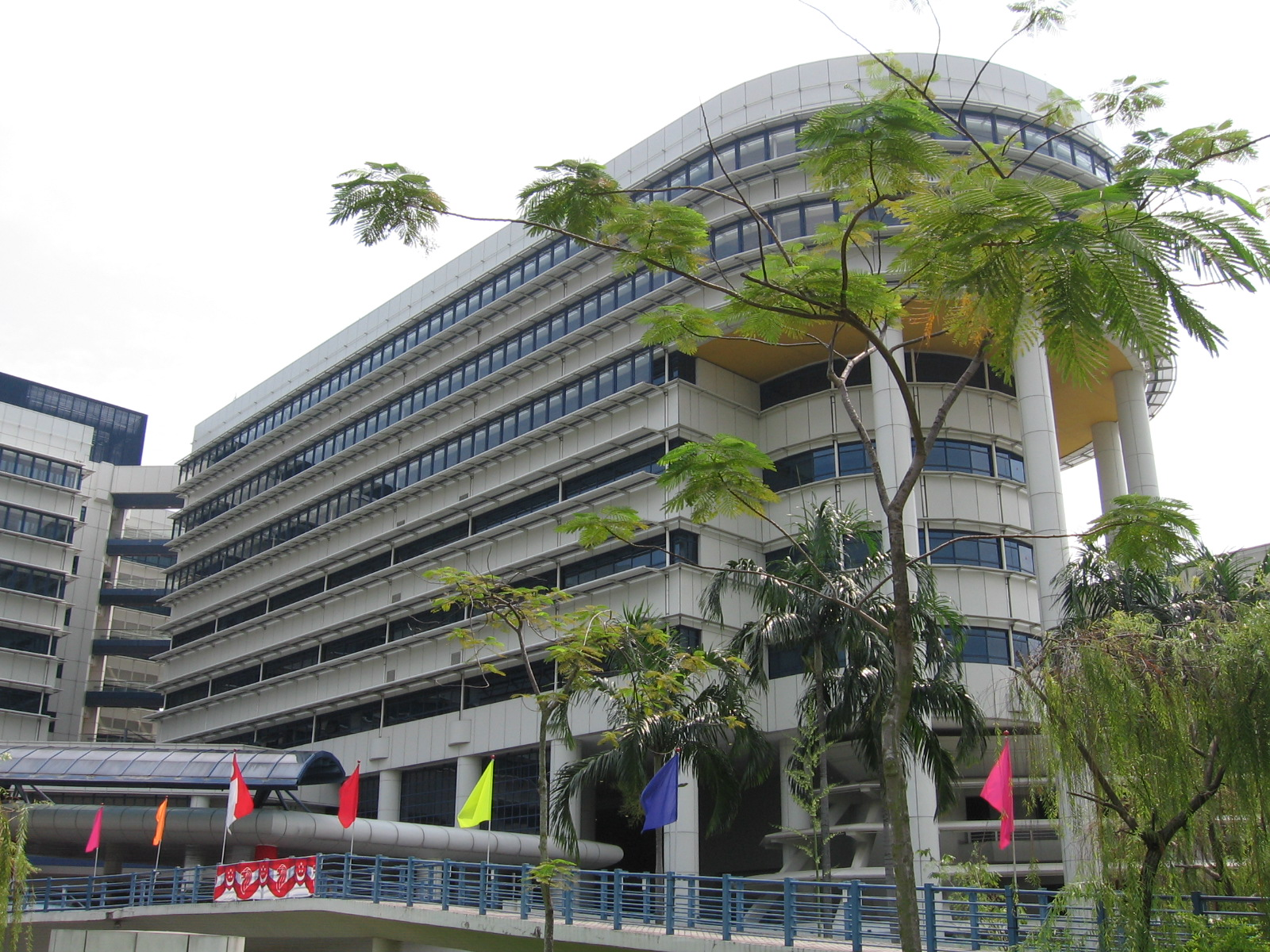
Sheares worked as an obstetrician and later the Head of Department of Obstetrics and Gynaecology at Kandang Kerbau Hospital (pictured).

Upon his graduation in March 1929, he worked as an assistant medical officer at SGH. Sheares was paid S$250.00 a month as a local, whereas a British assistant medical officer would be paid twice his salary. The journalist K. C. Vijayan theorised that the difference in pay could be "to maintain parity with their counterparts in London", among other reasons. After getting his Licence in Medicine and Surgery, Sheares had wanted to pursue internal medicine, but was unable to during his work as a medical officer at an outpatient clinic in Malacca. He worked there for two years, but was unhappy. In 1931, he was transferred to Kandang Kerbau Hospital (KKH), but was later transferred to SGH's obstetrics and gynaecology unit at the request of professor J. S. English on 8 April 1931. English sought Sheares due to his academic performance at KECOM.

Sheares subsequently specialised in obstetrics and gynaecology, becoming the first Singaporean to do so. He told New Nation in 1976 that "you were just ordered to specialise by the professor if you had good marks", but that "once I got involved, I loved the discipline". He continued to study midwifery and gynaecology under English, later becoming the only assistant in the obstetric and gynaecology unit. In 1937, English posted Sheares to KKH – which was converted to a maternity hospital in 1935 – to take responsibility for all obstetric patients at KKH. Sheares divided his time between practising gynaecology at SGH and dealing with obstetric cases at KKH. In 1939, he was awarded the Queen's Fellowship, which granted him two-years of postgraduate training in London. Sheares was to use the Fellowship to prepare for the Member of the Royal College of Obstetricians and Gynaecologists's (MRCOG) examinations, but the outbreak of World War II in Europe postponed his trip.

During the war in 1941, he continued working at KKH and was in charge of its two obstetrical wards. The hospital was damaged by the bombing from the Japanese military and was then converted into an emergency general hospital for injured civilians. Following the fall of Singapore in 1942, the Japanese interned British doctors, leading to local doctors taking up larger roles in the medical service. During the Japanese occupation, KKH was renamed the Chuo Byoin (lit. 'Central Hospital') and served both Japanese and Singaporean patients. Sheares was made the Deputy Medical Superintendent, which was responsible for all the Singaporean patients; the Medical Superintendent was responsible for Japanese patients. In August 1942, the Syonan Shimbun reported that Sheares was a part of the Japanese's "travelling dispensaries", which were mobile medical units sent to the rural areas of Singapore.

After the war, Sheares received the Good Service Certificate from the British for his "good service rendered during the war to the cause of the Allies and the liberation of Malaya". He was also made the acting professor of KECOM, (Note: KECOM would merge to become the University of Malaya in Singapore's (present-day National University of Singapore) Faculty of Medicine, following the university's creation in 1949.) a role he held while English was recovering in Britain after the war. In April 1947, he left the post and went to England to resume his postgraduate studies under the Queen's Fellowship, where he was admitted to the Royal Postgraduate Medical School in Hammersmith under professor James Browne. He went on to pass the MRCOG examinations in January 1948, becoming the first Singaporean to do so. He had planned to take an examination at the Royal College of Surgeons of Edinburgh to join the Fellowship of the Royal Colleges of Surgeons – he had registered for it in March 1948 – but returned to Singapore after being called on by then-governor of Singapore Franklin Gimson to return to his post as acting professor of obstetrics and gynaecology at KECOM following English's retirement.

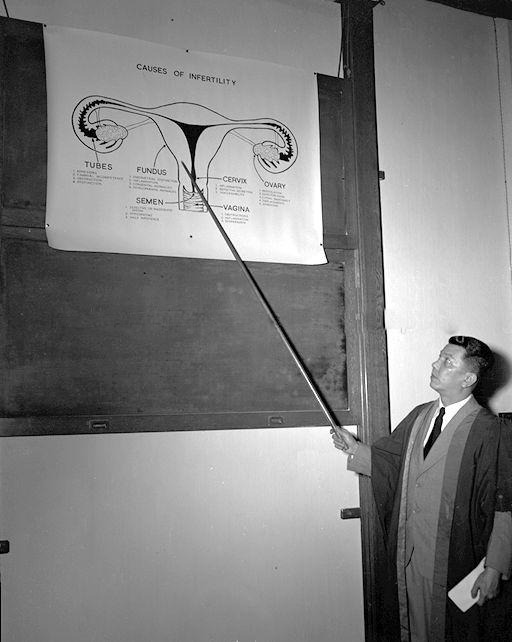
Sheares in April 1951, speaking at the University of Malaya in Singapore.

Upon his arrival back to Singapore, he was appointed the acting professor, with the job of professor being advertised in the British Medical Journal. Sheares faced prejudice as, despite serving as the acting professor for two years prior, the role of professor was not given to him as he was a local, and high-ranking colonials usually held such positions. He needed two referrals and asked English and KKH's Principal Medical Officer, who both refused and instead preferred a British medical officer. Sheares noted that the British medical officer had no experience in gynaecological surgery and poor knowledge in obstetrics. Sheares eventually got his referrals from two British physicians: Sir Eardley Holland, the chairman of the Board of Examiners who had previously examined him for his MRCOG, and Browne of the Royal Postgraduate Medical School.

With these referrals, Sheares met with the Selection Board in London and, in January 1950, became the first local professor of obstetrics and gynaecology at the University of Malaya in Singapore. In December 1951, Sheares used the remainder of his Queen's Fellowship study to go to the United States for a year. During this period, he studied at different teaching institutions in the United States, such as the Mayo Clinic. He remarked from his visit that "[KKH] was at least 50 years behind any American maternity hospital". Sheares returned in July 1952 to KKH and went on to improve their maternity services; he enhanced the antenatal supervision services and created a network of clinics that would be linked back to KKH. In 1952, the School of Midwifery was established, with Sheares serving as its chairman of the board, and he improved the training of midwives.

From 1953 to 1955, Sheares helped design new additions to the KKH building such as the out-patient department and the front block of the hospital, stating that, "[KKH] was initially just a maternity hospital and I had to design the new buildings in such a way that the maternity operating theatres were in a different block from the gynaecological operating theatres." In 1955, Sheares became the first Singaporean to be awarded a fellowship by the Royal College of Obstetricians and Gynaecologists, following his contributions to the sector. In March 1956, he founded the Bulletin of Kandang Kerdau Hospital, which later become the Singapore Journal of Obstetrics and Gynaecology, and served as its first editor. In 1959, Sheares advocated for voluntary sterilisation as a way to reduce population growth instead of legalising abortion, which he garnered criticism for. Sheares explained that even if abortions were made legal, people would still perform abortions illegally. He later stated that he believed that his critics assumed he was advocating for forced sterilisation, when he was really advocating for voluntary sterilisation, further saying, "they also did not understand the consequences of letting the population grow un-checked."

He served as the first president of the Obstetrical and Gynaecological Society, which was a part of the Singapore Medical Association, from 1960 to 1961. Sheares retired in March 1961 from both the National University of Singapore and KKH due to health complications such as severe acute gastric ulcers. He also had concerns that his ill health would reduce his ability to provide for his family. He subsequently went into private practice and worked at a clinic at Battery Road. He remained as an honorary consultant at KKH after his retirement. Additionally, Sheares was a personal gynaecologist and obstetrician to certain members of the Malaysian royal families, and was a consultant in three Malaysian states. In 1965, he suddenly collapsed at work due to a massive gastric haemorrhage, and received a gastrectomy operation from his colleague and friend Yeoh Ghim Seng. In 1968 and 1969, Sheares served as the chairman of the Chapter of Obstetrics and Gynaecology and on the obstetrics and gynaecology committee of the School of Postgraduate Medical Studies, respectively. In June 1970, he and economist Albert Winsemius were given the honorary degree of Doctor of Letters by the National University of Singapore.

=== Notable contributions ===
Regarded as "the father of obstetrics and gynaecology in Singapore", contributions by Sheares to obstetrics include the lower Caesarian section, which he standardised, that resulted in a lower mortality and morbidity rate in pregnant women than the upper Caesarian section. Initially, very few Caesarian sections were carried out in Singapore and, when they were, used the upper Caesarian section which was the established method at that time. Despite this, the upper Caesarian section was not used much as it had a high risk of damaging the uterine scar at the woman's next pregnancy. Sheares knew that the lower Caesarian section would be more effective but was unable to perform it under the previous professor, English.

During the Japanese occupation, Sheares became the head of department of obstetrics and gynaecology at KKH. This allowed him to perform the first lower Caesarian section in Singapore which eventually became the standard routine. Sheares also created a technique to make an artificial vagina for those born without one due to vaginal agenesis. The procedure involved surgically creating a cavity between the bladder and the rectum, which was then lined with either a skin graft taken from the thigh or buttock, or with a membranous tissue located between the urethra and the rectum. After he published the method in a 1960 paper, he received praise and worldwide attention from the United States, Europe, and Southeast Asia, who saw success with the method by their gynaecologists. The technique became known as the "Sheares operation", and is used to help women who suffer from birth defects such as vaginal agenesis or in sex-change operations.

The Sheares operation saw mention in the 1960 Journal of Obstetrics and Gynaecology of the British Empire. Vijayan attributes the success of his 1960 paper to his surgical experience from Sheares's past papers, such as his 1952 MD thesis of birth defects in the female reproductive system and his 1956 MS thesis on congenital and acquired vaginal atresia. His research on birth defects relating to the uterus saw international recognition, and he received the Master of Surgery from the University of Malaya in Singapore. Sheares authored and published a total of twenty-nine papers from 1940 to 1964.

== Presidency (1971–1981) ==
=== 1970 presidential election ===
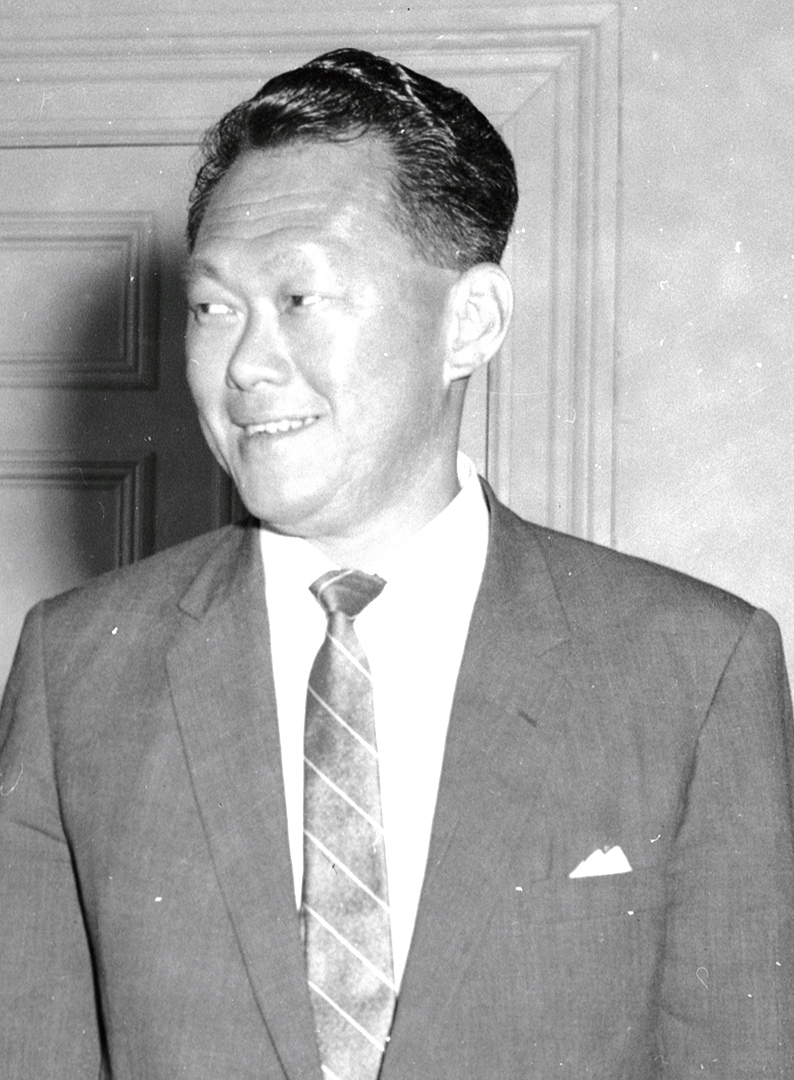
Prime minister Lee Kuan Yew (pictured) was a supporter of Sheares' election to the presidency at all three presidential elections.

Following the death of incumbent president Yusof Ishak, six people – Yeoh Ghim Seng, Othman Wok, Wee Chong Jin, Ismail bin Abdul, Punch Coomaraswamy, and A. P. Rajah – were considered to be the most likely candidates for the role in November 1970. The president was elected by Parliament instead of by popular vote. At the 1970 presidential election, then-prime minister Lee Kuan Yew nominated Sheares to become president and he became the second president of Singapore on 2 January 1971 after he was sworn in, following a unanimous agreement by Parliament. His mother was 91 years old when she learnt that her son had become the president of Singapore. Just two weeks before she died, she said "God has blessed Bennie especially after the way he looked after us and me."

Speculation on why Sheares was chosen to become the president include that he was non-partisan, as he was not a part of any political party, or that he was from a minority race in Singapore, to show the equality in the then-mostly Chinese dominated government. The Far Eastern Economic Review stated in a 1971 issue that Sheares was largely chosen due to his profession and success, along with showing diversity in the government. After the 1959 general election, where the People's Action Party (PAP) won in a landslide victory, the PAP was critical of the medical profession and the university due to their "flaccid anti-colonialism". Sheares' appointment to the presidency served as a symbol of unity between the government and academics.

=== First presidential term (1971–1974) ===
During his first term in 1971, he was appointed Chancellor of the National University of Singapore and he served in that role till 1981. That same year, Sheares opened the 1971 Commonwealth Heads of Government Meeting, holding dinners and tours for the representatives. In July 1971, Sheares awarded the first Singapore Armed Forces Overseas Scholarships, the second highest scholarship award to the President's Scholar. In October 1971, Sheares opened the S$10 million Sentosa Satellite Earth Station, the first site in Singapore to use satellites for communication. Later that month, following the British's announcement of withdrawing their troops from Singapore in August, Sheares attended a dinner in honour of the British's role in Singapore alongside other Parliament members. The following year, Sheares spoke on the importance of maintaining relations with the British. In February 1972, Sheares hosted a 3-day visit for Queen Elizabeth II and her family's visit to Singapore. He was awarded the Honorary Knight Grand Cross of The Most Honourable Order of the Bath, and gave the Order of Temasek to Queen Elizabeth II and Prince Philip, Duke of Edinburgh. He gave the Distinguished Service Order to Princess Anne.

In October 1972, Sheares opened the third Parliament, giving a speech about the new policies of the government for the next five years. He also announced new policies to be implemented in the government, including the periodic investigations of political parties by accountants and auditors, increased subsidiaries in health and education, and increasing the wages of workers. After the Robinsons department store fire in November 1972, Sheares appointed a three-man commission to do an inquiry into the fire in December. The report was received by Sheares in August 1973, and released to the public in December 1973. In February 1973, Sheares met American vice president Spiro Agnew upon his visit to Singapore, where Agnew discussed problems in Southeast Asia with other ministers. In March 1973, Sheares gave a speech at the Singapore Red Cross Society, praising their efforts in fundraising and stating that the society's status would soon be recognised by Singapore. In July 1973, after the creation of the Presidential Council for Minority Rights, Sheares swore in the chairman of the council Wee Chong Jin. In September 1973, Sheares opened the 7th South East Asian Peninsular Games at the National Stadium as the host country.

=== 1974 presidential election ===
At the 1974 presidential election, Sheares was nominated by Lee again to continue serving as the president, delivering a motion that Sheares had shown, "courage from tenacity" and had "carried his office with unassuming dignity, application, and self-discipline". Following this motion, Sheares received a unanimous agreement by Parliament and was elected to serve a second term.

=== Second presidential term (1974–1978) ===
Whilst serving his second term as president in 1974, Sheares taught demonstration classes at KKH to gynaecologists. In February 1974, Sheares assented eight acts including the Arms Offences Act and the Land Acquisition (Amendment) Act. In June 1975, Sheares stated that the government expected a growth of five percent in the economy that year. In July 1975, Sheares was made an honorary fellow of the Royal Society of Medicine by Sir John Stallworthy. In November 1975, Sheares gave a speech after opening the fifth Pan-Pacific Conference of the International Society for the Rehabilitation of the Disabled at the Singapore Conference Hall, stating that more security measures should be in place to reduce workplace accidents that leave workers disabled. In October 1976, Sheares appointed Arumugam Ponnu Rajah as a judge of the Supreme Court of Singapore. In December 1976, Sheares dissolved the third Parliament on the advice of the Cabinet, issuing Writs of Election for the 69 constituencies. In 1977, at the opening of the fourth Parliament, Sheares gave a speech addressing the economics and security of Singapore, stating that they have increased from prospects given in October 1972. Sheares also talked about adopting the science, technology, management, and marketing skills from the West.

=== 1978 presidential election ===
After his second term, Sheares had originally planned to retire as he felt that he did not have the energy for another term. However, Lee persuaded him and Sheares, then aged 71, participated in the 1978 presidential election. Lee held a motion in Parliament for Sheares' re-election to the office, stating that Sheares, "undertakes his social and protocol functions with conscientious interest, never treating them as perfunctory chores."

This received unanimous support from Parliament and Sheares was elected to a third term. This also made Sheares the first president to serve three terms. Upon his re-election, Sheares received praise for his service to the presidency from members of parliament Yeo Choo Kok, Sidek bin Saniff, and Ang Kok Peng.

=== Third presidential term (1978–1981) ===
During his third term in 1978, Sheares opened the ASEAN Inter-Parliamentary Assembly at Mandarin Hotel and the sixth Asia and Oceania Congress of Endocrinology at Shangri-La Hotel. At the latter, Sheares gave a speech on how more research in family planning for women was needed to strengthen future policies. In October 1978, Sheares appointed T. S. Sinnathuray as a Judge of the Supreme Court of Singapore. In 1979, Sheares assented multiple acts such as the Money-Changing and Remittance Business Act 1979 and the State Immunity Act 1979. Throughout the 1970s, the trade union in Singapore had been growing exponentially, especially that of the National Trades Union Congress. In 1980, Sheares was involved in improving commercial and economic relations with Kuwait after a visit by the Emir of Kuwait Jaber Al-Ahmad Al-Sabah where they discussed strengthening bilateral relations between the two countries. In February 1981, Sheares opened the fifth Parliament and gave a 15-minute long speech. Sheares served his third term as president until his death in office in March 1981. Devan Nair succeeded him as president. According to a medical assistant of his, Sheares had possibly donated his entire salary as president to charity.

== Personal life ==
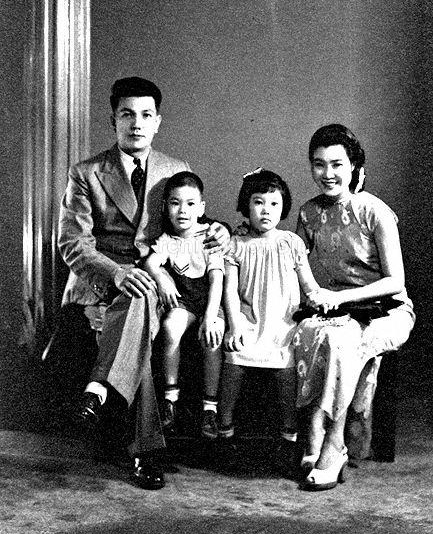
Sheares with his family c. 1946

Sheares' first wife was Wong Ah Foon, whom he married in 1931 and divorced in 1947. He married his second wife Yeo Seh Geok, a trained midwife, in 1939 and they had three children together. Their daughter, Constance, is an arts administrator, curator, and writer. Their son, Joseph, is a surgeon who specialises in cardiothoracic surgery.

In 1939, he was exonerated of all blame for a traffic accident where he hit a ten-year-old boy. In 1955, Sheares and his family were robbed in their bungalow, which was provided by the University of Malaya in Singapore, and had S$10,000 worth of jewellery and cash stolen from them. In November 1971, Sheares underwent medical treatment for a vascular disorder in the United States as the operation required had not yet been developed in Singapore. He returned in February 1972.

== Death and funeral ==
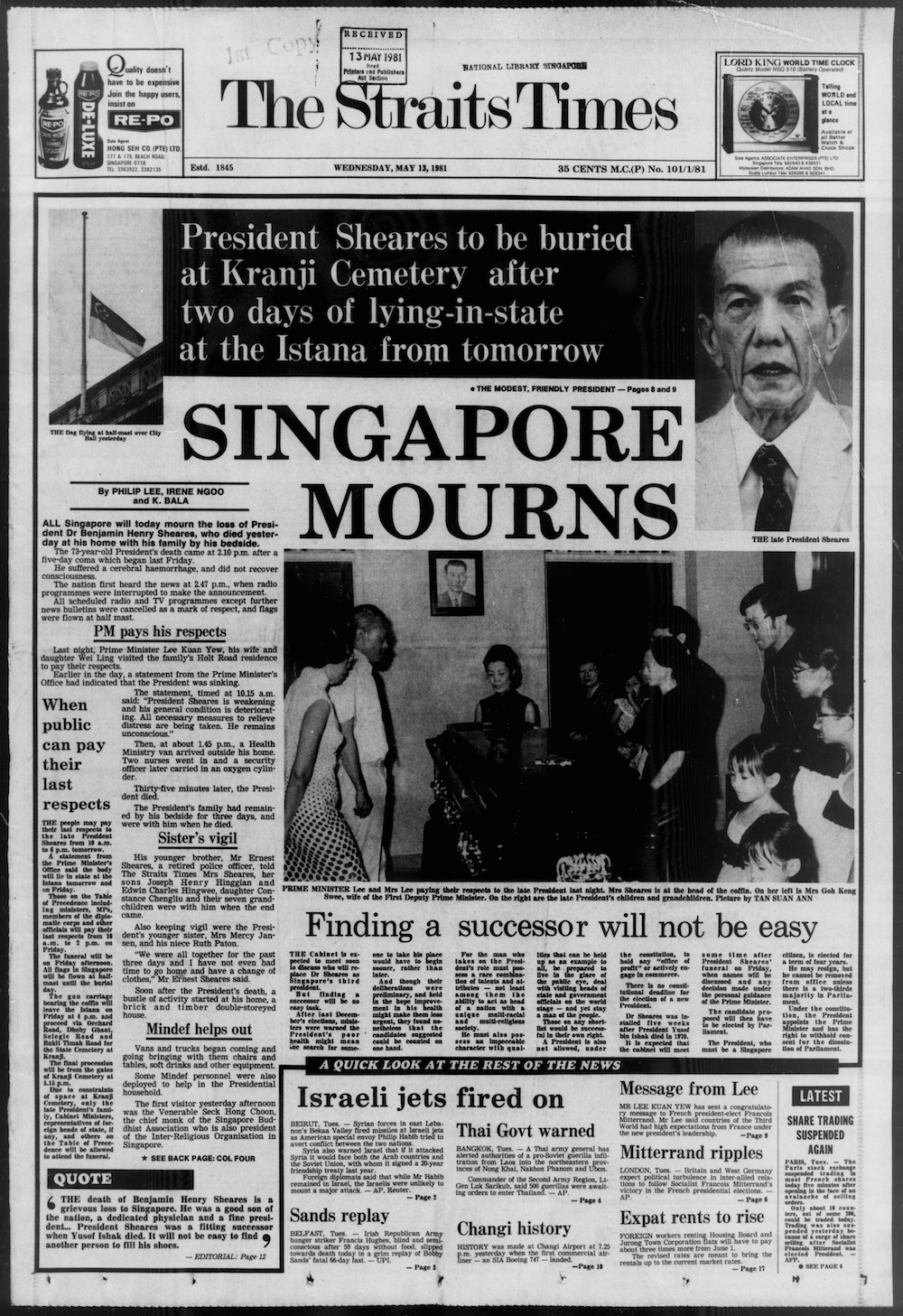

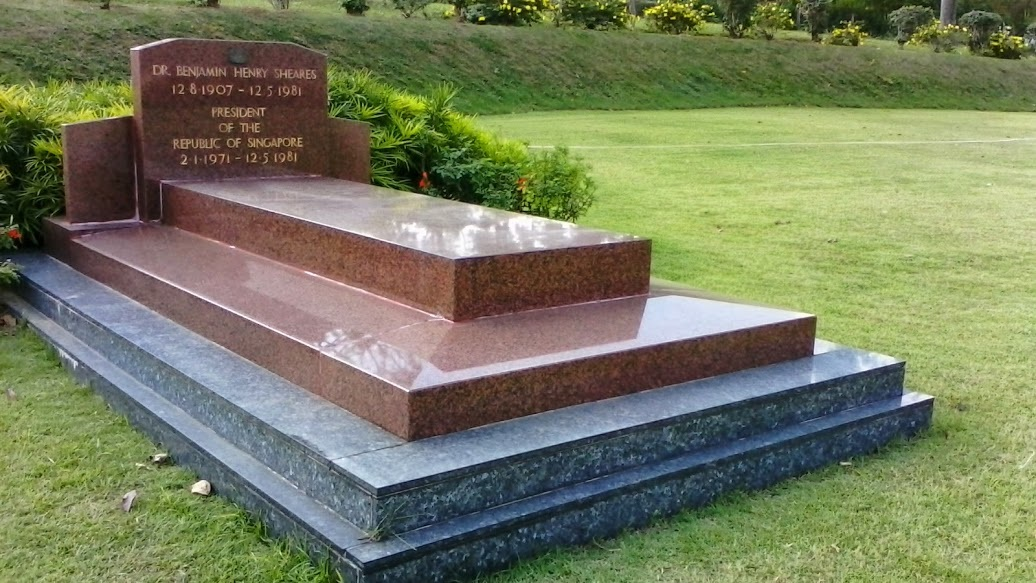
The Straits Times' report on 13 May 1981 on Sheares' death (top) and his grave at Kranji State Cemetery (bottom).

On 2 March 1981, it was discovered that Sheares had lung cancer. On May 3, Sheares suffered from a brainstem ischaemia which caused him to go unconscious. On 7 May, Sheares slipped into a coma after developing a cerebral haemorrhage. On 12 May, two nurses from the Ministry of Health and a security officer with oxygen cylinders and a stretcher were sent to his house. He died later that day at 2:10 pm.

News of his death was first announced at 2:47 pm and all scheduled radio and television programs were cancelled. The flag at City Hall was flown at half-mast in respect. An open casket service was held at his home with the first visitors being Chief Justice Wee Chong Jin and his wife, deputy prime minister Goh Keng Swee and his wife, and prime minister Lee Kuan Yew, Lee's wife, and Lee's daughter. Other visitors included environment minister Ong Pang Boon and member of parliament Lee Chiaw Meng.

Sheares' body was laid in state on 14 May with about 85,000 people showing up to pay their respects on 15 May. On 16 May, Sheares' coffin was carried from the Istana to Kranji State Cemetery to be buried where he was given a 21-gun salute by the Singapore Armed Forces. Foreign dignitaries who attended his funeral include Indonesian president Suharto, Thai prime minister Prem Tinsulanonda, Malaysian deputy prime minister Mahathir Mohamad, governor of Malacca Syed Zahiruddin Syed Hassan, and Filipino speaker of the house Querube Makalintal. Other countries such as New Zealand, Myanmar, Japan, South Korea, Brunei, Maldives, Nauru, Sri Lanka, United States, and Australia also sent their representatives.

United States president Ronald Reagan stated that Sheares' had "an unselfish public devotion which all Americans admire." Yang di-Pertuan Agong of Malaysia Sultan Ahmad Shah stated that he was "an illustrious son of Singapore who had contributed much to the existing close relationship between [the] two countries." Prime minister Lee said that "his humble and unassuming manner belied an intense commitment to excellence".

=== Legacy ===
Sheares is the first and only president to serve three terms and was also the longest-serving president at 10 years, before it was surpassed by S. R. Nathan in January 2010, who served for 12 years.

Locations in Singapore such as the Benjamin Sheares Bridge, Sheares Avenue, and Sheares Link are named after him. In academia, the student's residence Sheares Hall at the National University of Singapore, Benjamin Henry Sheares Professorship in Obstetrics & Gynaecology, Benjamin Sheares Professorship in Academic Medicine, and the Benjamin Sheares College at the Duke–NUS Graduate Medical School are all named after him.

== Honours ==
=== Foreign ===
- Kelantan
  - Honorary Commander of the Order of the Life of the Crown of Kelantan (1964)
- Kedah:
  - Knight Commander of the Order of the Crown of Kedah (1968)
- United Kingdom:
  - Honorary Knight Grand Cross of The Most Honourable Order of the Bath (GCB) (1972)
- Indonesia:
  - First Class of the Star of the Republic of Indonesia (1974)
- Philippines:
  - Grand Collar of the Order of Sikatuna, Rank of Raja (GCS) (1976)

== See also ==
- President of Singapore
- Benjamin Sheares Bridge

Political offices
Preceded by Yusof Ishak	President of Singapore; 1970–1981	Succeeded by Devan Nair
