= 1970 Singaporean presidential election =

- 30 December 1970
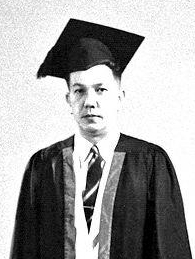
Nominee	Benjamin Sheares
Party	Independent
Electoral vote	54
President before election
Yeoh Ghim Seng (acting)
PAP
Elected President
Benjamin Sheares
Independent

Indirect presidential elections were held in Singapore on 30 December 1970, following the death of the incumbent president Yusof Ishak in November. At the time, the president was elected by parliament. Obstetrician and gynaecologist Benjamin Sheares was announced as a nominee, despite not being an expected choice. Prime minister Lee Kuan Yew nominated Sheares as president, which saw unanimous approval from parliament. Sheares was sworn in for his first term as president on 2 January 1971.

== Background ==
The office of the president of Singapore is the head of state of Singapore. It was established in 1965 following Singapore's independence from Malaysia, replacing the Yang di-Pertuan Negara. The role of the president is largely ceremonial, but at the time the president could give discretion to the appointment of the prime minister or dissolution of parliament. Prior to the 1991 constitutional amendment, which saw the president elected by popular vote, the president was elected by parliament.

== Candidates ==
Following incumbent president Yusof Ishak's death in office in November 1970, the Singaporean government began searching for a successor. Due to Yusof's extended illness prior to his death, prime minister Lee Kuan Yew and his cabinet were able to plan ahead for a possible successor. Although the full list of candidates has never been officially released, speculated candidates in the media include:

- Yeoh Ghim Seng, speaker of Parliament and acting president when Yusof was ill
- Othman Wok, minister for social affairs
- Wee Chong Jin, chief justice of Singapore
- Ismail bin Abdul Aziz, president of the Muslim Religious Council
- Punch Coomaraswamy, former speaker of Parliament
- A. P. Rajah, former speaker of Parliament

When obstetrician and gynaecologist Benjamin Sheares was announced as a nominee, it was seen as unexpected. Lee's relationship with Sheares was a factor in his nomination, with Lee knowing Sheares since 1940 when he lived nearby to him. Other speculation on why Sheares was chosen include that he was non-partisan and from a minority race in Singapore. The Far Eastern Economic Review opined that he was chosen due to his profession and success, along with showing diversity in the Chinese-dominated government.

His nomination was also seen as a symbol of unity between the government and academics, as the People's Action Party-led government had previously criticised the medical profession, the National University of Singapore, and the Eurasian community for their "flaccid anti-colonialism" after their victory at the 1959 general election.

== Results ==
The presidential election was held on 30 December 1970 at Parliament House. Prime minister Lee nominated Sheares before parliament for a four-year term as president. Speaking about him, Lee described him as "by disposition courteous, and by nature kind, modest and friendly". This was followed by members of parliament (MP) Rahmat bin Kenap, Ch'ng Jit Koon, and P. Govindaswamy speaking in support of Lee's nomination.

On that day's sitting, 54 out of the 58 MPs were present, with four members absent. (Note: The MPs were Yeoh Ghim Seng, Ong Pang Boon, Tang See Chim, and Ya'acob bin Mohamed.) Parliament unanimously voted to elect him as president. Following his successful election, Sheares was sworn in on 2 January 1971. His mother was 91 years old when she learnt that he had been elected president. Just two weeks before she died, she said "God has blessed Bennie especially after the way he looked after us and me."

Candidate	Party	Votes	%
Benjamin Sheares	Independent	54	100.00
Total		54	100.00
Total votes		54	–
Registered voters/turnout		58	93.10
