= KK Women's and Children's Hospital =

Hospital in Singapore

Kandang Kerbau Women's and Children's Hospital Hospital Wanita dan Kanak-kanak (Malay) 竹脚妇幼医院 (Chinese) கே கே பெண்கள் மற்றும் குழந்தைகள் மருத்துவமனை (Tamil)
- SingHealth

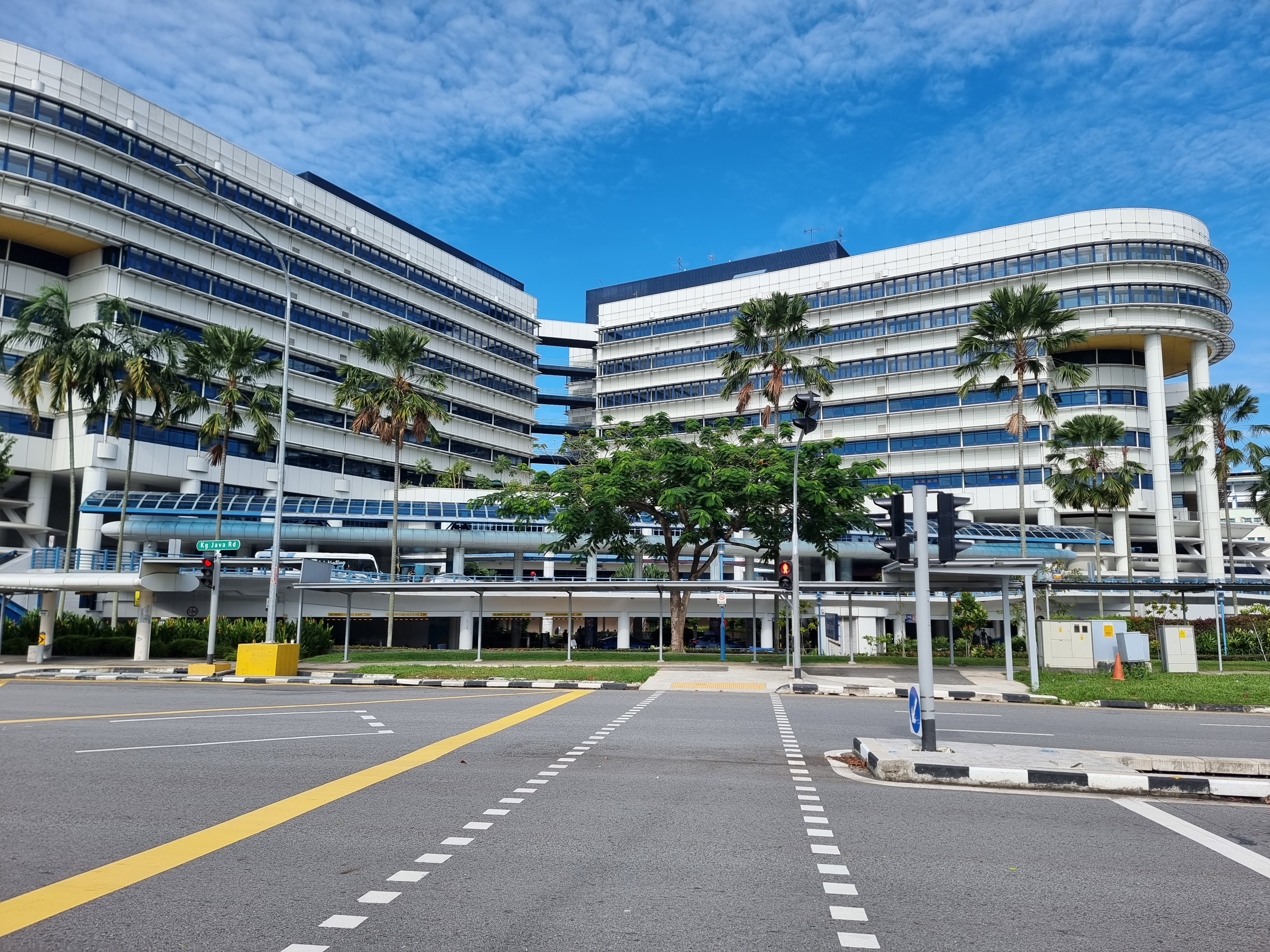
- Street view of KK Women's and Children's Hospital

Geography
- Location: 100 Bukit Timah Road, Singapore 229899, Singapore
- Coordinates: 1°18′38.0″N 103°50′49.0″E

Organisation
- Type: Specialist

Services
- Emergency department: Yes Accident & Emergency
- Beds: 864
- Speciality: Women's and children's hospital

History
- Founded: 1858; 168 years ago

Links
- Website: kkh.com.sg
- Lists: Hospitals in Singapore

Former Kandang Kerbau Hospital
- Interactive map of the Former Kandang Kerbau Hospital area

General information
- Type: Government offices
- Architectural style: Low-rise
- Owner: Land Transport Authority
- Operator: Land Transport Authority

Technical details
- Floor count: 3

National monument of Singapore
- Designated: 1 October 2025; 10 months ago
- Reference no.: 76

Kandang Kerbau Women's and Children's Hospital (KKH; commonly referred to as KK Women's and Children's Hospital) is a public hospital specialising in healthcare for women and children in Singapore, located at 100 Bukit Timah Road. It has 864 beds and provides obstetric and gynecology, neonatology, and pediatric services.

Originally a "lock hospital" for sex workers and prostitutes in 1872, the hospital was converted to a pauper hospital for women after sexually transmitted diseases decreased in Singapore. In 1924, it became a maternity hospital.

== Etymology ==
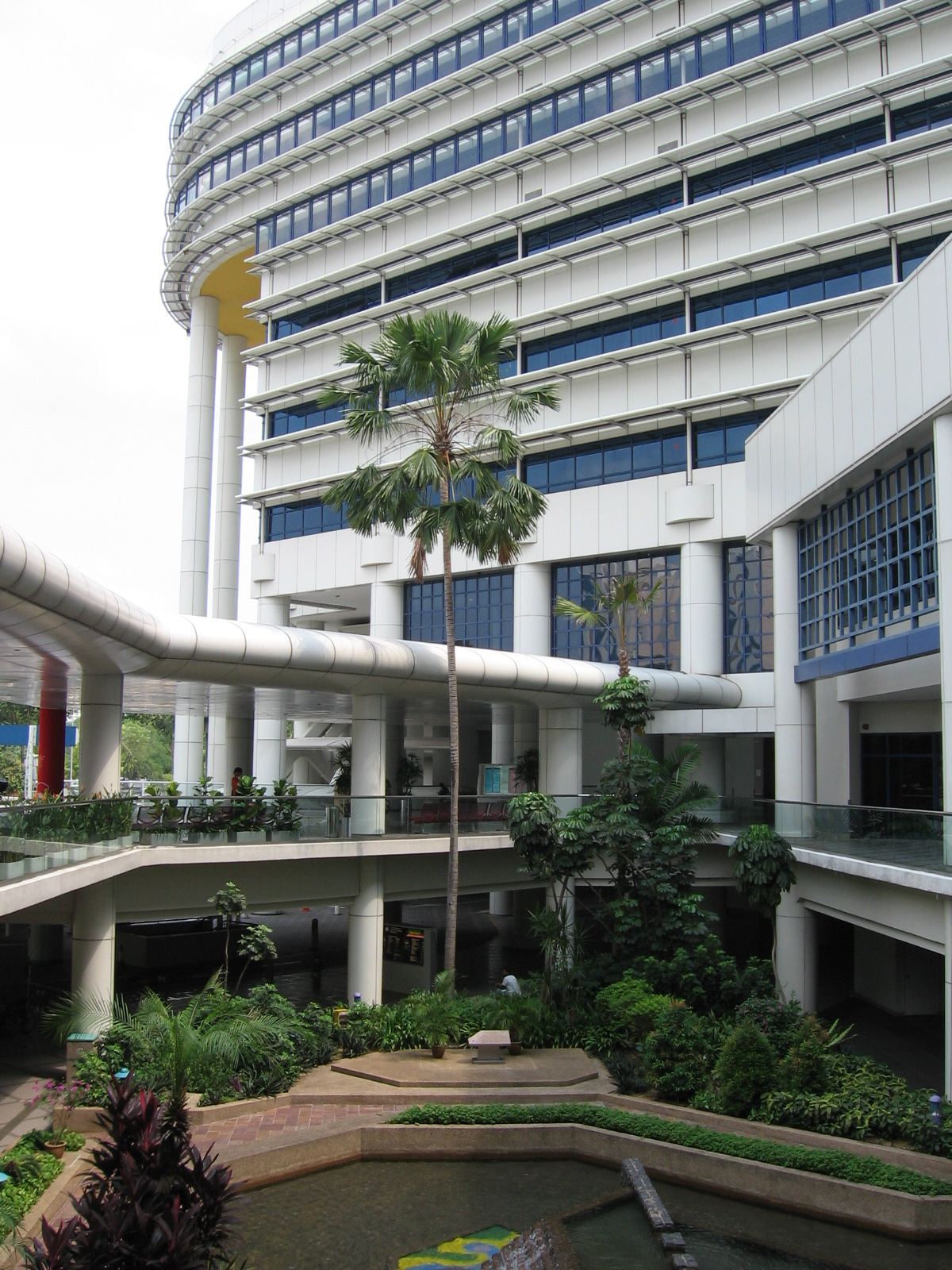
Another view of the hospital

The hospital's name comes from the Malay term for "buffalo shed" (kandang = shed / pen + kerbau = buffalo), reflecting the area's past link with buffalo rearing.

== History ==
The hospital was set up in 1858.

While the hospital initially started as one catering to health care for women, mainly for gynecology and obstetrics, it has since expanded its role.

First, the pediatrics department was added for the care of the babies after delivery, but over the years it expanded into a full pediatric service, treating younger patients for all kinds of illnesses up to teenagers. An offshoot, the neonatology service, was then added. Thus the expanded role of the hospital warranted a renaming to KK Women's and Children's Hospital.

=== 1924 to 1999: conversion to maternity hospital ===
On 1 October 1924, KKH was converted to a maternity hospital with 30 beds. It was also used to train students in midwifery and medicine.

During World War II, KKH became an emergency general hospital for the population when Japan attacked Singapore. During the Japanese occupation of Singapore, the hospital was called Chuo Byoin or Central Hospital.

In 1966, the hospital entered the Guinness Book of Records for delivering the highest number of newborns within a single maternity facility for that year, and it continued to hold on to this record for a full decade, delivering 85% of the population.

In March 1997, the hospital moved to its present site.

==== 2000s to present ====
As a result of a restructuring exercise in the local healthcare scene, the hospital became a member of the Singapore Health Services on 1 April 2000.

In 2003, the old premises were marked as a historical site by the National Heritage Board, a tribute to an institution that has been the birthplace of over 1.2 million Singaporeans since its inception. With the rich history of the former KK Hospital, it was gazetted as a national monument on 1 October 2025 and the old premises were leased to Land Transport Authority as a transportation museum and gallery.
