= Population planning in Singapore =

In the 1960s the Singapore government encouraged women, especially uneducated women, to get sterilised following their second child.

Population planning in Singapore has reflected various policies to both slow and boost the growth rate of Singapore's population. Singapore first began population planning initiatives in an attempt to slow and reverse the rapid increase in births that began after World War II. Later on, from the 1980s, policy was tailored towards growth, attempting to encourage mothers to have more children. In 2020, the annual total population growth rate in Singapore was −0.3%, and its resident total fertility rate (TFR) was 1.10, below the replacement rate of 2.1. In 2023, it further declined to 0.97. In 2025, the TFR reached a historic low of 0.87.

The first phase started with the launch of the Singapore Family Planning and Population Board in 1966 to aggressively promote family planning after Singapore faced "post-war food and housing shortages". SFPPB targeted low-socioeconomic status individuals, particularly females, and worked to encourage contraceptive use, such as condoms and birth control. The SFPPB advocated for small families, establishing the "Stop-at-Two" program, which encouraged and benefited two-child families and subsequent sterilisation. SFPPB also opened more clinics to improve the health and welfare of families. Aside from encouraging small families, policies set in place by the government during the "Stop-at Two" era de-incentivized having more than two children; civil workers were not paid for maternity leave after their second child, children's hospital fees were higher for third and subsequent children, top school choices were given to only children with parents who had been sterilized before the age of 40, and sterilization itself was rewarded with seven days of paid leave.

The government program "Stop-at-Two" was successful in achieving limited growth, but it is also attributed to the initial decline of Singapore's population. Following the "Stop-at-Two" campaigns, population planning has taken the form of attempts to reverse falling birth rates. The Singaporean government eventually became pro-natalist, and officially announced its replacement "Have-Three-or-More (if you can afford it)" campaign in 1987, where the government began to encourage and incentivize larger families for financially-stable families. Additionally, the Social Development Unit (SDU) was established in 1984 to promote marriage and romance between educated individuals. This second phase of population planning has been unsuccessful at reaching and maintaining the replacement rate.

== Limiting growth ==
=== Post war baby boom ===
Following World War II's end in 1945, the growth of Singapore's population was assessed to be unsustainable for its economic prospects; there were about 1 million born between the years of 1947 and 1964, with total live births increasing by 58%.

During this period, the average annual growth rate was 4.4%, of which 1% was due to immigration. Singapore experienced its highest birth rate in 1957 at 42.7 per thousand individuals. The associated risks of overpopulation, including resource depletion, environmental degradation, heightened unemployment, and increased costs of living, prompted the government's growth-culling response.

=== Overcrowding concerns ===
At the time of independence, many Singaporeans living in the Central Area lived in overcrowded shophouses. In 1947, the British Housing Committee Report noted Singapore had "one of the world's worst slums – 'a disgrace to a civilised community'", and the average person per building density was 18.2 by 1947. Rapid population growth was perceived as a threat to "political stability and living standards". Such a trend would lead to population overcrowding, which was thought to overwhelm employment opportunities and social services in education, health, and sanitation. These concerns lead also to the replacement of the Singapore Improvement Trust with the Housing and Development Board to provide resettlement en masse for Singapore's overcrowded population.

Despite their fall since 1957, birth rates in the 1960s were still perceived as high. On average, a baby was born every 11 minutes in 1965; Kandang Kerbau Hospital (KKH) – a women's hospital where most babies in Singapore were delivered – saw over 100 deliveries per day in 1962. In 1966, KKH delivered 39,835 babies, earning it a place in the Guinness Book of World Records for "largest number of births in a single maternity facility" each year for ten years. Because there was generally a massive shortage of beds in that era, mothers with routine deliveries were discharged from hospitals within 24 hours.

=== Introduction of family planning ===
Family planning was introduced to Singapore in 1949 by a group of volunteers led by activist Constance Goh. The loose association of volunteers eventually became the Family Planning Association of Singapore and established numerous sexual health clinics offering contraception, treatments for minor gynaecological ailments, and marital advice. Until the 1960s, there was no legislated government policy in family planning, but the postwar British colonial administration and the following Singaporean government provided grants and land for its facilities network for the association. This cooperation culminated in 1960 with a three-month nationwide family planning campaign that was jointly conducted by the Association and government. The population growth rate slowed from 4–5% per year in the 1950s to around 2.5% in 1965 around independence. The birth rate had fallen to 29.5 per thousand individuals, and the natural growth rate had fallen to 2.5%.

Singapore's population expansion can be seen in the graph below:

Population growth 1947–2000
Period	Growth
1947–1957	84.7%
1957–1970	90.8%
1970–1980	13.3%
1980–1990	18.5%
1990–2000	20.6%
2000–2010	40.9%

=== Singapore Family Planning and Population Board ===
In 1959, the People's Action Party came to power in the first election following the granting of Singapore's internal autonomy. In September 1965 the Minister of Health, Yong Nyuk Lin, submitted a white paper to Parliament, recommending a Five-year Mass Family Planning programme that would reduce the birth rate to 20.0 per thousand individuals by 1970. This initiative became known as the National Family Programme. A year later in 1966, the Singapore Family Planning and Population Board (SFPPB) was established based on the findings of the white paper, providing clinical services and public education on family planning. Initially allocated a budget of $1 million SGD for the entire programme, the SFPPB faced a resistant population, but eventually serviced over 156,000. The Family Planning Association of Singapore was absorbed into the activities of the SFPPB.

=== Stop-at-Two ===
In the late 1960s, Singapore was a developing nation and had not yet undergone the demographic transition; though birth rates fell from 1957 to 1970. In 1970, birth rates rose as women who were themselves the product of the postwar baby boom reached maturity. Fearing that Singapore's growing population might overburden the developing economy, Lee started a vigorous Stop at Two family planning campaign. Abortion and sterilisation were legalised in 1970, and women were urged to get sterilised after their second child.

The government also added a gradually increasing array of incentives and disincentives between 1968 and 1973, penalising parents for having more than two children, raising the per-child costs of each additional child:

- In 1968 with the Employment Bill, female employees would not receive maternity leave for their fourth child or any subsequent children;
- In April 1969, the accouchement fee of $10 charged at Government Maternity Hospitals was raised to $50 after the 3rd baby;
- In 1972, these measures were introduced:
  - The incentives:
    1. Waiver of delivery charges in Government maternity hospitals for women who undergo sterilisation after delivery.
    2. For ward C-class patients who have undergone sterilisation, the ward charges are remitted.
    3. Government delivery charges are also waived if the husband undergoes sterilisation within a month after the wife delivered child.
    4. Patients undergoing sterilisation are granted medical leave on generous terms.
  - The disincentives:
    1. Delivery charges in Government Hospitals increase with each additional child.
    2. No paid maternity leave is given for delivery of the fourth child and subsequent children.
    3. No priority is given to large families in the allocation of Housing and Development Board flats.
- Updates to these earlier measures were announced and debated in Singapore Parliament on 24 October 1972 and came into effect on 1 August 1973:
  - Reduction of income tax relief to cover only the first three children;
  - Reduction of paid maternity leave from three to two confinements;
  - Lowering the priority for allocation of Housing and Development Board (HDB) flats for bigger families. Two or less have highest priority, four or more would have little priority;
  - Progressive increment of childbirth fees charged in government hospitals based on birth order. These fees are waived if the man or woman underwent sterilisation;

Accouchement fees	A Ward	B Ward	C Ward
1st Child	250	100	50
2nd Child	300	150	75
3rd Child	350	150	100
4th Child	400	250	200
5th Child	400	300	

- Third or fourth children were given lower priorities in education;
- Top priority in top-tier primary schools would be given only to children whose parents had been sterilised before the age of forty.

The Singapore Family Planning and Population Board created a large array of public education material for the Stop-at-Two campaign, in one of the early examples of the public social engineering campaigns the government would continue to implement (Speak Mandarin, Speak Good English, National Courtesy, Keep Singapore Clean and Toilet Flushing Campaigns) that would lead to its reputation as "paternalistic" and "interventionist" in social affairs. The "Stop at Two" media campaign from 1970 to 1976 was led by Basskaran Nair, press section head of the Ministry of Culture, and created posters with lasting legacy: a 2008 Straits Times article wrote, "many middle-aged Singaporeans will remember the poster of two cute girls sharing an umbrella and an apple: The umbrella fit two nicely. Three would have been a crowd." This same poster was also referred to in Prime Minister Lee Hsien Loong's 2008 National Day Rally speech. Many other posters from the "iconic" campaign included similar themes of being content with two girls, to combat the common trend in developing Asian societies for families with only daughters to continue "trying for a boy".

In addition to promoting just having two children, the government encouraged individuals to delay having their second child and to marry late, reinforcing the inevitable demographic transition. Other slogans and campaign material exhorted Singaporeans with such messages as:

- "Small Families – Brighter Future: Two is enough" (this message captioned a photo of two young girls)
- "The second can wait" (a mother and father are seen as being happy with one child)
- "Teenage marriage means rushing into problems: A happy marriage is worth waiting for"
- "One, Two: And that's ideal: Sterilisation, the best method for Family Limitation" (shown with a cartoon of two girls' faces)
- "Take your time to say 'yes'"
- Small Family: Brighter Future
- "Please stop at two!" (a stork carries a four-member nuclear family)

The Straits Times interviewed mothers who were sterilised in that era, noting it was common to get sterilised at a young age, citing a woman who had undergone tubal ligation at KKH at the age of 23, herself coming from a large family of ten. "The pressure [disincentives] was high. The Government clearly didn't want us to have more than two." A gynaecologist doctor who worked KKH recalled sterilisation rates became "sky high" after the disincentives had been implemented; it was common for hospital workers to chide women who were pregnant with third-order or higher births, recommending abortions, while such women talked about their pregnancy "[as if] they committed a crime". The Straits Times also suggested the disincentives had been very effective; one woman cited how sterilisation certification had to be shown to a school for a third child to receive priority, while she and four out of five sisters eventually underwent sterilisation. Expensive delivery fees ("accouchement fees") for third-order and higher births would also be waived with sterilisation.

The campaign was known to target the uneducated in particular; Lee believed that, "Free education and subsidised housing lead to a situation where the less economically productive people ... are reproducing themselves at [a higher rate]." He believed that implementing a system of government disincentives would stop "the irresponsible, the social delinquents" from thinking that having more children would entitle them to more government-provided social services.

We must encourage those who earn less than $200 per month and cannot afford to nurture and educate many children never to have more than two...we will regret the time lost if we do not now take the first tentative steps towards correcting a trend which can leave our society with a large number of the physically, intellectually and culturally anaemic. Lee Kuan Yew, 1969

The government justified its social policy as a means of encouraging the poor to concentrate their limited resources on nurturing their existing children, making them more likely to be capable, productive citizens. The government also had to respond to criticism that this policy favoured Chinese over minority races; Malays and Indians were stereotyped to have higher birth rates and bigger families than the Chinese, further fuelling accusations of eugenics.

=== Demographic transition and the Graduate Mothers Scheme ===
As Singapore modernised in the 1970s, fertility continued to drop. The natural replacement rate reached 1.006 in 1975; thereafter the replacement rate would drop below unity. Furthermore, the so-called "demographic gift" was occurring in Singapore as with other countries; increases in income, education and health and the role of women in the workforce were strongly correlated to levels of low population growth. According to a paper by the Library of Congress, by the 1980s, "Singapore's vital statistics resembled those of other countries with comparable income levels but without Singapore's publicity campaigns and elaborate array of administrative incentives."

Lee was alarmed at the perceived demographic trend that educated women – most of all the college-educated – would be less likely to marry and procreate. Such a trend would run antithetical to his demographic policy, and part of this failure, Lee conjectured, was "the apparent preference of male university graduates for less highly educated wives". This trend was deemed in a 1983 speech as "a serious social problem". Starting 1984, the government of Singapore gave education and housing priorities, tax rebates and other benefits to mothers with a university degree, as well as their children. The government also encouraged Singapore men to choose highly educated women as wives, establishing the Social Development Unit (SDU) that year to promote socialising among men and women graduates. Ironically, the SDU was known colloquially as "Single, Desperate and Ugly". The government also provided incentives for educated mothers to have three or four children, in what was the beginning of the reversal of the original Stop at Two policy. The measures sparked controversy and what became known as The Great Marriage Debate in the press. Some sections of the population, including graduate women, were upset by the views of Lee Kuan Yew, who had questioned that perhaps the campaign for women's rights had been too successful:

Equal employment opportunities, yes, but we shouldn't get our women into jobs where they cannot, at the same time, be mothers...our most valuable asset is in the ability of our people, yet we are frittering away this asset through the unintended consequences of changes in our education policy and equal career opportunities for women. This has affected their traditional role ... as mothers, the creators and protectors of the next generation.

— Lee Kuan Yew, "Talent for the future", 14 August 1983

Lee's views reflected his earlier positions—in 1967, Lee was recorded as believing that "five percent" of a society's population, "who are more than ordinarily endowed physically and mentally," should be allocated the best of a country's limited resources to provide "a catalyst" for that society's progress. He theorized that such a policy for Singapore would "ensure that Singapore shall maintain its pre-eminent place" in Southeast Asia. Similar views shaped education policy and meritocracy in Singapore.

However, the uproar over the proposal led to a swing of 12.9 percent against the People's Action Party government in the 1984 general election. In 1985, especially controversial portions of the policy that gave education and housing priorities to educated women were eventually abandoned or modified.

A 1992 study noted that 61% of women giving birth had secondary education or higher, but this proportion dropped for third-order births (52%) and fourth-or-higher-order births (36%), supporting the idea that more children per capita continue to be born to women with less qualifications, and correspondingly, lower income. Many incentives were given to graduate women to marry and give birth to produce babies which were believed to be 'highly intelligent' to maximise the talent pool in Singapore. Women without O-Level qualifications, deemed low-income and lowly educated, were offered by the government seven days' paid sick leave and $10,000 SGD in cash incentives to voluntarily undergo the sterilisation procedure.

== Phase 2: Increase Fertility ==
=== Have-Three-or-More (if you can afford it) ===
In 1986 the Government of Singapore had recognised that falling birth rates were a serious problem and began to reverse its past policy of Stop-at-Two, encouraging higher birth rates instead. By 30 June of that year, the authorities had abolished the Family Planning and Population Board, and by 1987, the total fertility rate had dropped to 1.44. That year, Goh Chok Tong announced a new slogan: Have Three or More (if you can afford it), announcing that the government now promoted a larger family size of three or more children for married couples who could afford them, and promoted "the joys of marriage and parenthood". The new policy took into account Singapore's falling fertility rate and its increased proportion of the elderly, but was still concerned with the "disproportionate procreation" of the educated versus the uneducated, and discouraged having more than two children if the couple did not have sufficient income, to minimise the amount of welfare aid spent on such families. The government also relaxed its immigration policies.

In October 1987, future Prime Minister Lee Hsien Loong, then a young Brigadier-General, exhorted Singaporeans to procreate rather than "passively watch ourselves going extinct". United Press International noted the "baffled" reaction of parents, many who had grown up in an era where they were told that having more than two children was "antisocial". One parent commented, "are we being told to have more children for the sake of the country or for ourselves?" Goh Chok Tong, despite the scepticism, remained optimistic that the population rate would be restored to the replacement rate by 1995. An NUS sociologist however, observed that Singapore had "a new breed of women" – one "involved in their careers [and] used to a certain amount of leisure and more material possessions" – and hence would not be as receptive to financial incentives as previous women of the 1960s and the 1970s. As of 2011, Singapore's birth rate has not yet been restored to replacement level.

=== Policy comparisons between Have-Three-or-More and Stop-at-Two, starting 1988 ===
Several changes have been made to try to increase the fertility rate.

Mothers with a third child would get 750 SGD in child relief (factoring historic exchange rates, this was about $662 in 2010 US dollars). If a mother had three 'O'-level passes in one sitting, she would qualify for an enhanced child relief rebate (lowered from a threshold of five passes). Having a fourth child would qualify for enhanced child relief of 750 SGD plus 15% of the mother's income, up to 10000 SGD. All disincentives and penalties given in school registration to families with more than two children are to be removed; in the presence of competition, priority would be allocated to families with more than two children. Subsidies for each child in a government-run or government-approved child care centre Medisave could now be authorised for hospital costs of a third child (previously forbidden under the Stop at Two policy) Families with more than two children with a HDB flat of three rooms or higher would receive priority if they desired to upgrade to a larger flat "Abortions of convenience" discouraged, with compulsory abortion counselling Women undergoing sterilisation with less than three children would receive compulsory counselling Expansion of the SDU's role and authority; recognising that the low birth rate reflected late marriages, the SDU also wooed those with postsecondary A-level qualifications rather than just college graduates

Starting 1990, a tax rebate of 20,000 SGD (US$18,000 in 2010 dollars, factoring historic exchange rates) were given to mothers who had their second child before the age of 28 Starting 1993, the sterilisation cash grant for lowly educated women was liberalised, allowing women to agree to use reversible contraception rather than sterilisation; educational bursaries for existing children were added as existing benefits, so long as the number did not exceed two.

=== Statistics on Failure of Phase Two ===
Phase Two started in the early 1960s. The natural rate of increase (per 1,000 population) between the years of 1955–1960 (five years previous to phase two) was 35.4. Five to ten years later, the natural rate of increase decreased to 27.8. Following that, 20 years later the natural rate of increase continued to decline. The natural rate of increase between the time period of 1980–1985, was 12.2, and several years after that, between the years of 2010–2015 the natural rate of increase, continued decreased to 4.6. The lowest natural rate of increase seen in Singapore and according to the data of the United Nations (2017) will continue to decline. The rate of natural increase in Singapore is forecasted to decrease to 1.2 between the period of 2025–2030.

Singapore population
Time period	Rate of natural increase
1955–1960	35.4
1960–1965	27.8
1965–1970	19.7
1970–1975	16.8
1975–1980	11.8
1980–1985	12.2
1985–1990	13.1
1990–1995	13.4
1995–2000	9.7
2000–2005	6.7
2005–2010	5.6
2010–2015	4.6

=== Modern legacy and current practices ===
The modern SDU, renamed the Social Development Network in 2009, encourages all Singaporean couples to procreate and marry to reverse Singapore's negative replacement rate. Some of the social welfare, dating and marriage encouragement, and family planning policies are also managed by the Ministry of Community Development, Youth and Sports.

Channel NewsAsia reported in January 2011 that the fertility rate of Singaporeans in 2010 were 1.02 for Chinese, 1.13 for Indians and 1.65 for Malays. In 2008, Prime Minister Lee Hsien Loong said the below-national-average birth rate for the Chinese was a "worrying trend". That same year, he was quoted as saying, "[If] you marry a non-graduate, then you are going to worry if your son or daughter is going to make it to the university."

Different sources have offered differing judgments on the government policies' impact on the population structure of Singapore. While most agree that the policies have been very interventionist, comprehensive and broad, the Library of Congress Country Study argues "it is impossible to separate the effects of government policies from the broader socioeconomic forces promoting later marriage and smaller families," suggesting that the government could only work with or work against much more powerful natural demographic trends. To the researchers of the study, the methods used in 1987 to attempt to reverse the falling birth rate was a demonstration of "the government's [continued] assumption" that citizens were receptive towards monetary incentives and administrative allocation of social services when it came to family planning.

However Saw Swee Hock, a statistician and demographer quoted in the Straits Times in 2008, argued the demographic transition "was rapid because of the government's strong population control measures," but also admitted that, "even without the Stop at Two policy, the [total fertility rate] would have gone below 2.1 due to [the demographic transition]." When demographic transition statistics are examined – in 1960, the total fertility rate was approximately ~6 – Asian MetaCentre researcher Theresa Wong notes that Singaporean birth rates and death rates fell dramatically in a period that occurred over "much shorter time period than in Western countries," yet such a short time frame is also seen in other Southeast Asian countries, where family planning campaigns were much less aggressive. According to Saw Swee Hock, "the measures were comprehensive and strong, but they weren't reversed quickly enough".

Though newer modern policies exhibit "signs that the government is beginning to recognise the ineffectiveness of a purely monetary approach to increasing birth rates", a former civil servant noted that the government needs "to learn to fine-tune to the emotions rather than to dollars and cents. It should appeal more to the sense of fulfilment of having children". Such measures include promoting workplaces that encourage spending time with the family, and creating a "Romancing Singapore Campaign" that "[directly avoided being linked] to pro-children and pro-family initiatives," since "people get turned off" when the government appears to intervene in such intimate social affairs as marriage. However, this is still seen by some citizens as "trivialising" love and "emotional expression", which "should not be engineered". In 2001, the government announced a Baby Bonus scheme, which paid $9000 SGD for the second child and $18000 for the third child over six years to "defray the costs of having children", and would match "dollar for dollar" what money parents would put into a Child Development Account (CDA) up to $6000 and $12000 for the second and third child respectively. In 2002, Goh Chok Tong advised "pragmatic" late marriers "to act fast. The timing is good now to get a choice flat to start a family."

== See also ==
- Two child policy
- Abortion in Singapore
- Demographics of Singapore
- Family planning
- Human population control
