= Demographics of Singapore =

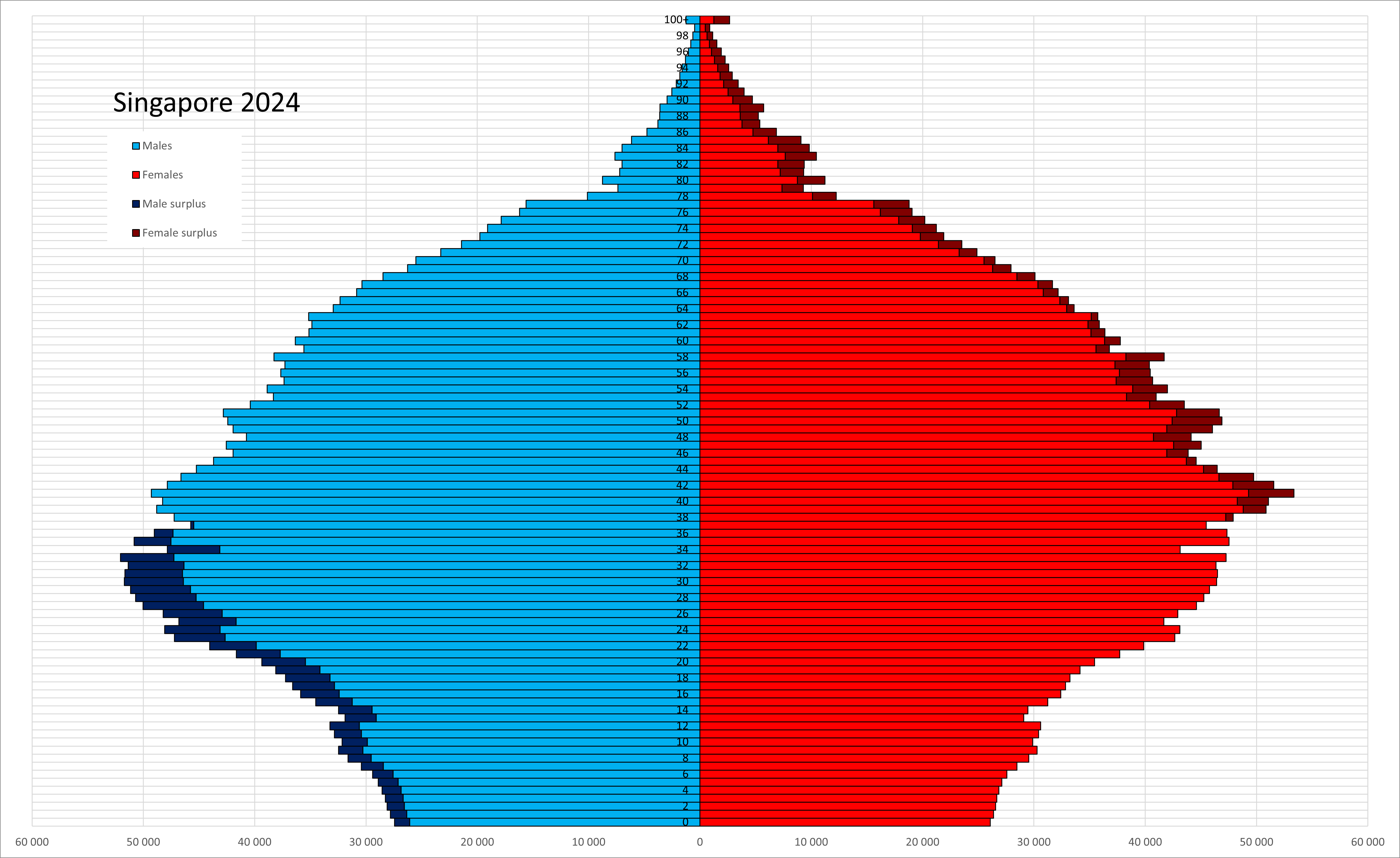
- Population pyramid of Singapore in 2024
- Population: 6,208,500 (2026)
- Birth rate: ▼6.5 births/1,000 population (2025)
- Death rate: 6.0 deaths/1,000 population (2025)
- Life expectancy: ▲83.9 years (2025)
  - male: ▲81.9 years (2025)
  - female: ▲86.0 years (2025)
- Fertility rate: ▼0.87 (2025)
- Infant mortality: 2.0 deaths/1,000 live births (2025)
- Immigrant share: 40.7% (2026)

Age structure
- 0–14 years: 13.3% (2026)
- 15–64 years: 67.2% (2026)
- 65 and over: 19.5% (2026)

Nationality
- Nationality: Singaporean
- Major ethnic: Chinese (73.9%)
- Minor ethnic: Malay (13.5%); Indian (9.0%); Eurasian and others (3.6%)

Language
- Official: English, Mandarin, Malay, Tamil
- Spoken: English, Singlish, Mandarin, Malay, Tamil and others

As of June 2026, Singapore had a total population of 6.30 million. This includes 4.23 million residents, consisting of 3.68 million Singaporeans and 546,660 permanent residents. The remaining 1.98 million are non-residents. Singapore is a multiethnic and multicultural society. The resident population is broadly classified under the CMIO system: Chinese, Malay, Indian, and "Others." While Malays are recognised as the indigenous community, ethnic Chinese account for 75.5 percent of residents, with Malays and Indians making up 15.1 and 7.6 percent respectively. As of the 2020 census, these three groups constitute 98.2 percent of the resident population. The remaining 1.8 percent, categorised as Others, are largely Eurasians. The non-resident population is not classified under the CMIO framework and comprises a wide range of nationalities. Consequently, there are no comprehensive public statistics available regarding the ethnic composition of Singapore's total population.

Major religions include Buddhism, Christianity, Islam, Taoism and Hinduism, although about 20 percent of residents have no religion. More minor religions such as Judaism and Sikhism also maintain a presence. Non-residents, whose numbers have risen sharply since the 1990s and accounted for nearly 30 percent of the total population in 2020, are excluded from resident statistics and may originate from a wide range of nationalities beyond the CMIO framework. Officially, mixed-race Singaporeans are typically assigned their father's race, though their identity card may also reflect both parents' ethnicities.

Singapore has four official languages: English, Malay, Mandarin and Tamil. Malay holds the status of national language, while English is the main working language. The education system is bilingual, with English as the medium of instruction and a second language, usually Malay, Mandarin or Tamil, also required. Singlish, a contact language, is commonly spoken in informal settings across all major ethnic groups.

In 2024, the resident total fertility rate (TFR) was 0.97, with Chinese at 0.83, Malays at 1.58, and Indians at 0.91. Singapore had one of the world's eight lowest TFRs in 2023.

== History ==
=== Population growth ===
Population growth and immigration in selected periods
Period	Population increase	Natural increase	Net immigration
1881–1891	43,857	−30,932^{A}	74,798
1901–1911	75,729	−59,978^{A}	135,707
1921–1931	230,387	18,176	212,211
1947–1957	507,800	395,600	112,200
1970–1980	339,400	315,400	24,000
1990–2000	980,755	325,887	654,868
2000–2010	1,048,845	224,718	824,127
2010–2020	609,075	203,643	405,432
^A Negative figures are due to low birth rate and high death rate

Historically, the Orang Seletar—the division of Orang Laut or Sea Nomads, which is closely related to Malays—formed Singapore's main population until the arrival of the British in 1819.

Population growth in Singapore was fuelled by immigration for a long period of time, starting soon after Stamford Raffles landed in Singapore in 1819, when the population of the island was estimated to be around 1,000. The first official census taken in January 1824 showed that the resident population of Singapore had grown to 10,683: 4,580 Malays, 3,317 Chinese, 1,925 Bugis, 756 natives of India, 74 Europeans, 16 Armenians, and 15 Arabs. Chinese males greatly outnumbered the females; in the 1826 population figures there were 5,747 Chinese males but only 341 Chinese females, in contrast to 2,501 Malay males and 2,289 Malay females. The figures for around a thousand Indians in 1826 were also similarly skewed towards male – 209 male and 35 female Bengalis, 772 males and 5 females from the Coromandel Coast. By 1836, the population figure had risen to 29,980, and marked a change in demographics as the Malays were outnumbered for the first time; 45.9% of the population were Chinese versus 41.9% for Malays (including Javanese and Bugis). Women from China were discouraged from emigrating, and most of the Chinese females in this early period of Singapore were likely nyonyas from Malacca; it was noted in 1837 that there were no Chinese women in Singapore who had emigrated directly from China.

The imbalance of the sexes continued for a long period, for example, the 1901 census figures show that there were 130,367 Chinese males compared to 33,674 Chinese females. Such imbalance also meant that fewer people were born in early Singapore, and in the first hundred years, most of the Chinese population in Singapore were immigrants. By the late 1890s, only around 10% of the Chinese population in Singapore were born there. Many of the early migrant workers from China and India did not intend to settle permanently to raise their families in Singapore; they worked to send back remittance to their families back home, and would return to China or India after they had earned enough money. Later an increasing number of Chinese chose to settle permanently in Singapore, especially in the 1920s when it became more favourable to stay in Singapore rather than returning to China. Change in social attitude in the modern era also meant that Chinese women were freer to emigrate from China, and the sex ratio began to normalise. This gradual normalisation of sex ratio led to an increase in the number of native births. Immigration continued to be the main reason for the Chinese population increase in Singapore until the 1931–1947 period when the natural increase in population surpassed the net immigration figure.

After World War II, in the period from 1947 to 1957, Singapore saw a massive population increase mostly due to increased number of native births. The birth rate rose and the death rate fell; the average annual growth rate was 4.4%, of which 1% was due to immigration; Singapore experienced its highest birth rate in 1957 at 42.7 per thousand individuals. (This was also the same year the United States saw its peak birth rate.)

Immigration to Singapore also fell sharply after Singapore independence due to tighter control of immigration from Malaysia and other countries. The population increase became dominated by native births with 315,400 in the 1970–1980 period due to natural increase compared to 24,000 from net migration. However, a lower rate of natural growth in population and the need for low-skill labour resulted in a deliberate shift in policy by the Singapore government to allow more foreigners to live and work in the country, and net migration increased in the 1980–1990 period to nearly 200,000. By the decade of 1990–2000, the net migrant number of over 600,000 had surpassed the natural growth of the population, and accounted for nearly two-thirds of the population increase. The same high level of immigration is also seen in the next decade with 664,083 net migration recorded.

Net migration rate	9.12 migrants/1,000 population (2006 est.)

Due to the continued low birth rate, amongst other reasons, the Singapore government has varied its immigration policy over the years. As the demand for labour grew with industrialisation, foreign talent with professional qualifications as well as less-skilled foreign workers has made up a significant and increasing proportion of Singapore's total population since the 2000s and 2010s. Curbs on immigration, however, began to be implemented in the 2010s to ease increasing social issues arising from the high level of immigration. When deciding who can become a permanent resident or citizen, the government also takes ethnicity into account to maintain the country's existing ethnic composition.

=== Population planning ===
Per-period population growth, 1947—2000
Period	Growth rate
1947—1957	84.7%
1957—1970	90.8%
1970—1980	13.3%
1980—1990	18.5%
1990— 2000	20.6%

The post-war boom in births led to an interest in family planning, and by 1960, the government publicly funded and supported family planning programmes. After independence in 1965, the birth rate had fallen to 29.5 per thousand individuals, and the natural growth rate had fallen to 2.5%. Birth rates in the 1960s were still perceived as high by the government; on average, a baby was born every 11 minutes in 1965. Kandang Kerbau Hospital (KKH)—which specialised in women's health and was the most popular hospital to have children—saw over 100 deliveries per day in 1962. In 1966, KKH delivered 39835 babies, earning it a place in the Guinness Book of World Records for "largest number of births in a single maternity facility" for ten years. Because there was generally a massive shortage of beds in that era, mothers with routine deliveries were discharged from hospitals within 24 hours.

In September 1965 the Minister for Health, Yong Nyuk Lin, submitted a white paper to Parliament, recommending a "Five-year Mass Family Planning programme" that would reduce the birth rate to 20.0 per thousand individuals by 1970. In 1966, the Family Planning and Population Board (FPPB) had been established based on the findings of the white paper, providing clinical services and public education on family planning.

By 1970, the Stop at Two campaign was firmly established, implementing incentives, disincentives and public exhortation to discourage families from having more than two children. After 1975, the fertility rate declined below replacement level, in a sign that Singapore was undergoing the demographic transition. In 1983, the Graduate Mothers' Scheme was implemented in an attempt to get educated women, especially women with a university degree, to marry and procreate, while the government encouraged women without an O-level degree to get sterilised. This was done out of the Lee Kuan Yew government's belief that for the nation to best develop and avoid hardship, the educated classes should be encouraged to contribute to the nation's breeding pool, while the uneducated should not, sparking the Great Marriage Debate.

In 1986, the government reversed its population policy—except its stance on low-income, lowly-educated women—and initiated the Have Three or More (if you can afford it) campaign, offering cash and public administration incentives to have children. In 2001, the Singapore government started its Baby Bonus scheme.

Singapore has one of the lowest fertility rates in the world. In 2012, Singapore total fertility rate (TFR) was 1.20 children born per woman, a sub-replacement fertility rate. Ethnic Chinese had a fertility of 1.07 in 2004 (1.65 in 1990), while Malays had a TFR of 2.10 (2.69 in 1990). Both figures declined further in 2006. TFR for Indians was 1.30 in 2004 and 1.89 in 1990. The Singapore government has launched several highly publicised attempts to raise the fertility rate and increase awareness of the negative effects of an ageing population, the elderly (65 and above) had constituted 9.9% of its population in 2012; this proportion is still significantly lower than that of many other developed nations, such as the United States and Japan. In February 2015, National University of Singapore launched the "New Age Institute" in conjunction with Washington University in St. Louis to conduct research on this issue.

In 2025, Singapore’s fertility rate reached a historic low of 0.87 projected to fall to 0.76 by 2026 based on recent births according to demoriaresearch.com

=== Area planning ===
The population of Singapore are generally housed within new towns, which are large scale satellite housing developments designed to be self contained. It includes public housing units, private housing, a town centre and other amenities. Since the 1950s, Singapore had a city centre surrounded by slums and squatter colonies. By 1959 when Singapore attained self government, the problem of housing shortage had grown. Combined with a fast population growth, it led to congestion and squalor. The new towns planning concept was introduced in July 1952 by the country's public housing authority, Housing and Development Board (HDB), to counter the housing shortage problem and to relocate most of the population crammed within the city centre to other parts of the island. Today, there are 23 new towns and 3 estates within the country, with Bedok being the largest by area and population.

=== Population White Paper ===
In early 2013, the Parliament of Singapore debated the policies set out in the Population White Paper (PWP) titled A Sustainable Population for a Dynamic Singapore. The White Paper noted that by 2030, around 900,000 baby boomers would make up one quarter of the citizen population and that the workforce would begin to shrink "from 2020 onwards". It projected that by 2030, Singapore's total population could range between 6.5 and 6.9 million, with the resident population between 4.2 and 4.4 million and the citizen population between 3.6 and 3.8 million. To address these challenges, the PWP recommended increasing the number of foreign workers to strike a balance between skilled and less skilled labour, as well as to provide healthcare and domestic services. It also argued that foreign workers support businesses in times of economic growth.

The motion was passed by a vote of 77 to 13 in the People's Action Party (PAP)–dominated Parliament, following amendments that removed the phrase "population policy" and placed greater emphasis on infrastructure and transport development. Opposition to the motion came from non–PAP parliamentarians, including all seven MPs of the Workers' Party (WP). In addition, three Non-constituency Members of Parliament (NCMPs) voted against it, two from the WP and one from the Singapore People's Party (SPP). Several Nominated Members of Parliament (NMPs) also expressed dissent, with three casting votes against the motion and one choosing to abstain.

Outside Parliament, the PWP was heavily criticised and panned by opposition parties and government critics. WP's Low Thia Khiang criticised current measures of increasing the fertility rate, claiming that this would lead to an increase of a higher cost of living and discourage young couples from having more kids. As for current immigration policies, he had noted that immigrants were a source of friction for Singaporeans and that an increased population would put more stress and strain on the urban infrastructure. On 16 February 2013, an estimated 4,000 Singaporeans gathered at the Speakers' Corner in Hong Lim Park to protest against the PWP. Participants voiced concerns that the projected population increase would strain public services and drive up the cost of living. The event was noted as the largest protest of an anti government nature to be held at the Speakers' Corner since its establishment in 2000.

== Population ==
=== Population size and growth by residential status ===
View source data.
View source data.
View source data.

Source: Singapore Department of Statistics

Year	Number ('000)					Growth (year on year)					Land area (km^{2})	Population density (persons per km^{2})
Year	Total population	Total residents	Singapore citizens	Permanent residents	Non-residents	Total population	Total residents	Singapore citizens	Permanent residents	Non-residents	Land area (km^{2})	Population density (persons per km^{2})
1950	1,022.1	na	na	na	na	4.4%	na	na	na	na	na	na
1955	1,305.5	na	na	na	na	4.6%	na	na	na	na	na	na
1960	1,646.4	na	na	na	na	3.7%	na	na	na	na	581.5	2,831
1965	1,886.9	na	na	na	na	2.5%	na	na	na	na	581.5	3,245
1970	2,074.5	2,013.6	1,874.8	138.8	60.9	2.8%	na	na	na	na	586.4	3,538
1975	2,262.6	na	na	na	na	1.5%	na	na	na	na	596.8	3,791
1980	2,413.9	2,282.1	2,194.3	87.8	131.8	1.5%	1.3%	na	na	na	617.8	3,907
1985	2,736	2,482.6	na	na	253.3	0.1%	1.6%	na	na	na	620.5	4,409
1990	3,047.1	2,735.9	2,623.7	112.1	311.3	2.3%	1.7%	1.7%	2.3%	9.0%	633	4,706
1995	3,524.5	3,013.5	2,823.7	189.8	511	3.1%	1.8%	1.4%	8.3%	11.2%	647.5	5,443
2000	4,027.9	3,273.4	2,985.9	287.5	754.5	2.8%	1.8%	1.3%	9.9%	9.3%	682.7	5,900
2005	4,265.8	3,467.8	3,081	386.8	797.9	2.4%	1.6%	0.8%	8.6%	5.9%	697.9	6,121
2010	5,076.7	3,771.7	3,230.7	541.0	1,305.0	1.8%	1.0%	0.9%	1.5%	4.1%	712.4	7,126
2015	5,535.0	3,902.7	3,375.0	527.7	1,632.3	1.2%	0.8%	1.0%	0%	2.1%	719.1	7,697
2020	5,685.8	4,044.2	3,523.2	521.0	1,641.6	−0.3%	0.4%	0.6%	−0.8%	0.02%	728.3	7,810
2025	6,111.2	4,204.5	3,660.7	543.8	1,906.7	1.2%	0.6%	0.7%	−0.2%	2.7%	736.3	8,300

=== Gender composition of resident population ===
Source: Singapore Department of Statistics

Year	Number ('000)			
Year	Total resident population	Males	Females	Sex ratio (males per 1,000 females)
1960	1,646.4	859.6	786.8	1,093
1965	1,886.9	973.8	913.1	1,066
1970	2,013.6	1,030.8	982.8	1,049
1975	2,262.6	1,156.1	1,106.5	1,045
1980	2,282.1	1,159.0	1,123.1	1,032
1985	2,482.6	1,258.5	1,224.2	1,028
1990	2,735.9	1,386.3	1,349.6	1,027
1995	3,013.5	1,514.0	1,499.5	1,010
2000	3,273.4	1,634.7	1,638.7	998
2005	3,467.8	1,721.1	1,746.7	985
2010	3,771.7	1,861.1	1,910.6	974
2015	3,902.7	1,916.6	1,986.1	965
2020	4,044.2	1,977.6	2,066.7	957
2025	4,204.5	2,044.6	2,159.9	947

=== Age distribution of resident population ===
Source: Singapore Department of Statistics

Year	Age group (years)							Median age (years)
Year	0–14	15–24	25–34	35–44	45–54	55–64	65 and over	Median age (years)
1990	23.0%	16.9%	21.5%	16.9%	9.0%	6.7%	6.0%	29.8
2000	21.9%	12.9%	17.0%	19.4%	14.3%	7.2%	7.2%	34.0
2005	20.1%	13.0%	15.6%	17.9%	16.2%	9.1%	8.1%	35.8
2010	17.4%	13.5%	15.1%	16.7%	16.6%	11.7%	9.0%	37.4
2015	15.4%	13.0%	14.4%	15.8%	15.8%	13.7%	11.8%	39.6
2020	14.5%	11.4%	14.5%	14.8%	15.0%	14.6%	15.2%	41.5
2025	13.6%	10.2%	13.9%	15.0%	14.5%	13.9%	18.8%	43.2

This animation shows the share of age groups for the population of Singapore from 1960 – 2016. The age group which contains the median is highlighted. The population of Singapore is considered to be ageing rapidly.

=== Resident population by sex and age (2026) ===
Age group	Male	Female	Total	%
Total	2,055,410	2,176,120	4,231,530	100
0–4	81,640	77,340	158,980	3.76
5–9	99,620	95,230	194,850	4.60
10–14	107,680	102,780	210,460	4.97
15–19	106,730	103,000	209,730	4.96
20–24	107,410	104,390	211,800	5.01
25–29	132,260	130,730	262,990	6.22
30–34	154,280	162,930	317,210	7.50
35–39	158,120	174,280	332,400	7.86
40–44	146,260	164,510	310,770	7.34
45–49	144,440	160,560	305,000	7.21
50–54	148,060	158,600	306,660	7.25
55–59	139,780	148,360	288,140	6.81
60–64	146,820	150,410	297,230	7.02
65–69	135,960	141,010	276,970	6.44
70–74	108,040	116,980	225,020	5.32
75–79	76,570	89,670	166,240	3.93
80–84	32,710	43,820	76,530	1.81
85–89	19,900	32,010	51,910	1.23
90+	9,040	19,520	28,560	0.67

Age group (years)	Males	Females	Total population	% of total population
0–14	288,940	275,350	564,290	13.34
15–64	1,384,160	1,457,770	2,841,930	67.16
65+	382,310	443,010	825,320	19.50

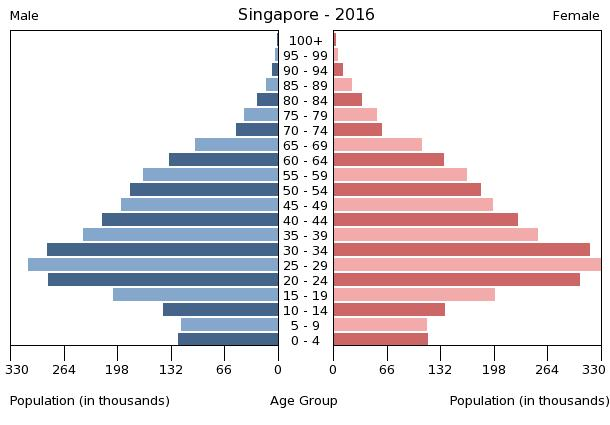
Population pyramid according to the CIA

=== Fertility and mortality ===
Fertility and mortality
Year	Total live-births	Resident live-births	Crude birth rate (per 1,000 residents)	Total fertility rate (per female)	Gross reproduction rate (per female)	Net reproduction rate (per female)	Total deaths	Crude death rate (per 1,000 residents)	Infant mortality rate (per 1,000 resident live-births)	Life expectancy at birth (years)	Life expectancy at birth for males (years)	Life expectancy at birth for females (Years)	Natural growth	Natural change
1950			45.4	N.A.	N.A.	N.A.		12	82.2					
1955			44.3	N.A.	N.A.	N.A.		8.1	49.5					
1960			37.5	5.76	2.78	2.54		6.2	34.9					
1965			29.5	4.66	2.27	2.08		5.4	26.3					
1970	45,934	N.A.	22.1	3.07	1.49	1.42	10,717	5.2	20.5	65.8	64.1	67.8	35,217	16.9
1975			17.7	2.07	1	0.97		5.1	13.9					
1980	41,217	40,100	17.6	1.82	0.88	0.86	12,505	4.9	8	72.1	69.8	74.7	28,712	12.7
1985			16.6	1.61	0.78	0.76		4.9	7.6					
1990	51,142	49,787	18.2	1.83	0.88	0.87	13,891	4.7	6.6	75.3	73.1	77.6	37,251	13.5
1995			15.6	1.67	0.8	0.8		4.8	3.8					
2000	46,997	44,765	13.7	1.6	0.77	0.77	15,693	4.5	2.5	78	76	80	31,304	9.2
2005			10.2	1.26	0.61	0.61		4.4	2.1					
2006			10.3	1.28	0.62	0.61		4.4	2.6					
2007			10.3	1.29	0.62	0.62		4.5	2.1					
2008	39,826		10.2	1.28	0.62	0.62	17,222	4.4	2.1				22,604	5.8
2009	39,570		9.9	1.22	0.59	0.59	17,101	4.3	2.2				22,469	5.6
2010	37,967	35,129	9.3	1.15	0.56	0.55	17,610	4.4	2	81.7	79.2	84	20,357	4.9
2011	39,654	36,178	9.5	1.2	0.58	0.58	18,027	4.5	2	82	79.5	84.1	21,627	5
2012	42,663		10.1	1.29	0.62	0.6	18,481	4.5	1.8	82.1	79.8	84.3	24,182	5.6
2013	39,720		9.3	1.19	0.57	0.57	18,938	4.6	2	82.4	80.1	84.5	18,982	4.7
2014	42,232		9.8	1.25	0.61	0.6	19,393	4.7	1.8	82.8	80.5	84.9	22,839	5.1
2015	42,185			1.24			19,862						22,323	
2018	39,039	35,040	8.8	1.14	0.56	0.55	21,282	5	2.1	83.4	81.2	85.5	17,757	3.8
2019	39,279	35,330	8.8	1.14	0.56	0.56	21,446	5	1.7	83.6	81.4	85.7	17,833	3.8
2020	38,590	34,323	8.5	1.1	0.53	0.53	22,045	5.2	1.8	83.9	81.5	86.1	16,545	3.3

Life expectancy in Singapore since 1950

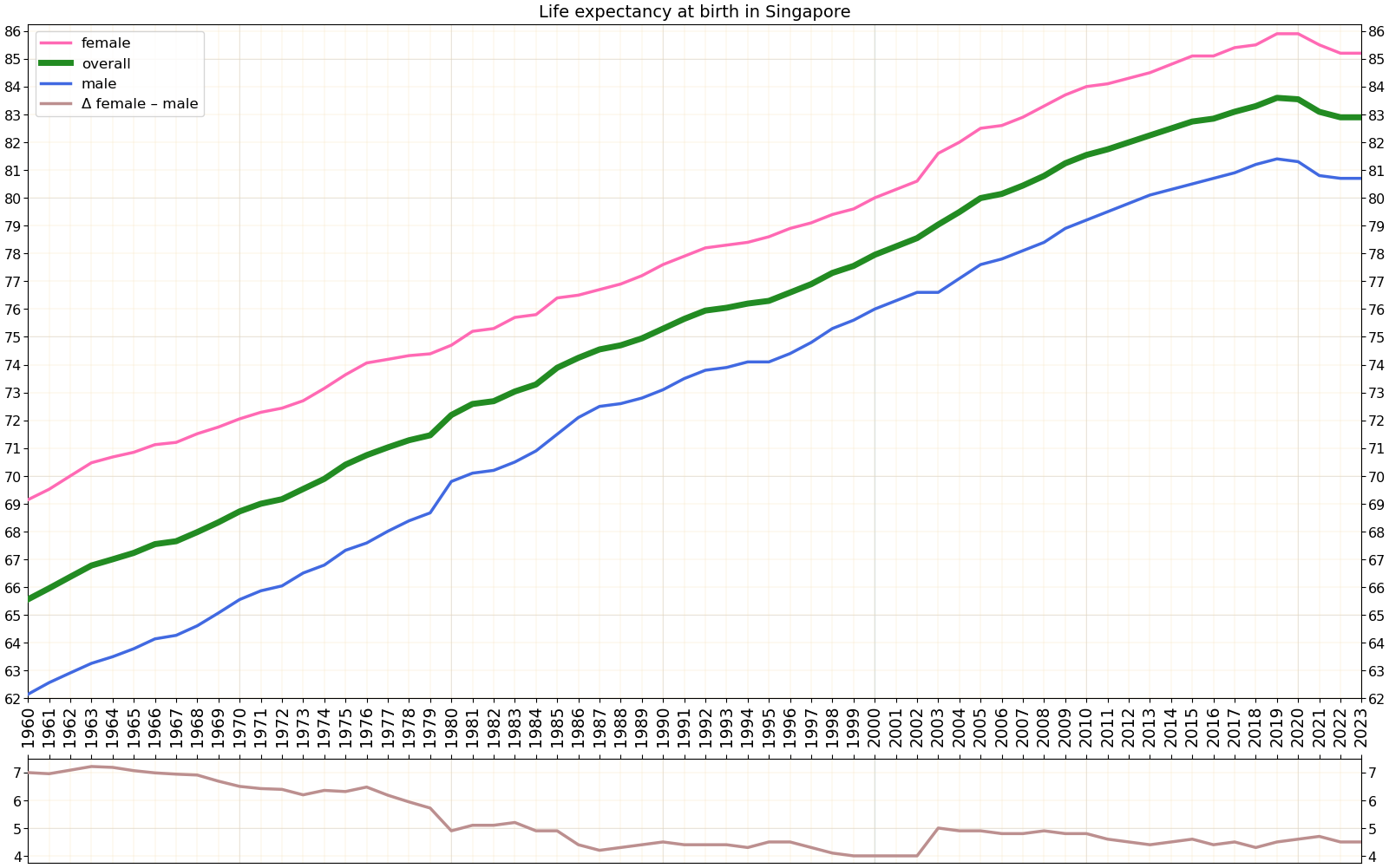
Life expectancy in Singapore since 1960 by gender

Population, fertility rate and net reproduction rate, United Nations estimates

- Source: Department of Statistics of Singapore: Population Trends, 2020

== Vital statistics ==
=== Registered births and deaths ===
Data from Singapore Department of Statistics, Ministry of Home Affairs:

Notable events in Singaporean demography:

- 1942–1945 – Second World War

	Average population	Live births	Deaths	Natural change	Crude birth rate (per 1000)	Crude death rate (per 1000)	Natural change (per 1000)	Crude migration rate (per 1000)	Total fertility rate (TFR)
1900	228,400	11,920	8,740	3,180	52.2	38.3	13.9		
1901	232,200	12,340	8,860	3,480	53.1	38.1	15.0	1.4	
1902	236,100	12,780	9,020	3,760	54.1	38.2	15.9	0.6	
1903	240,100	13,220	9,210	4,010	55.1	38.3	16.7	−0.1	
1904	244,200	13,670	9,370	4,300	56.0	38.4	17.6	−0.8	
1905	248,400	14,140	9,460	4,680	56.8	38.1	18.7	−2.0	
1906	252,700	14,630	9,540	5,090	57.9	37.8	20.1	−3.2	
1907	257,100	15,120	9,660	5,460	58.8	37.5	21.3	−4.2	
1908	261,600	15,710	9,830	5,880	60.0	37.6	22.5	−5.4	
1909	266,200	16,320	9,990	6,330	61.3	37.5	23.8	−6.6	
1910	270,900	16,930	10,180	6,750	62.5	37.6	24.9	−7.7	
1911	304,300	18,230	11,020	7,210	59.9	36.2	23.7	96.7	
1912	311,600	19,040	11,240	7,800	61.1	36.1	25.0	−1.6	
1913	319,000	19,850	11,490	8,360	62.2	36.0	26.2	−3.1	
1914	326,600	20,660	11,710	8,950	63.2	35.9	27.4	−4.2	
1915	334,300	21,480	11,930	9,550	64.3	35.7	28.6	−5.7	
1916	342,200	22,400	12,220	10,180	65.4	35.7	29.7	−6.8	
1917	350,200	23,310	12,540	10,770	66.6	35.8	30.8	−8.1	
1918	358,400	24,320	15,960	8,360	67.9	44.5	23.3	−0.5	
1919	366,600	24,950	12,940	12,010	68.1	35.3	32.8	−10.6	
1920	375,000	25,510	13,180	12,330	68.0	35.2	32.9	−10.7	
1921	417,900	26,900	14,080	12,820	64.4	33.7	30.7	80.2	
1922	427,800	27,540	14,280	13,260	64.4	33.4	31.0	−8.0	
1923	437,900	28,220	14,560	13,660	64.5	33.2	31.2	−8.3	
1924	448,200	28,940	14,820	14,120	64.5	33.1	31.5	−8.7	
1925	458,800	29,660	15,040	14,620	64.7	32.8	31.9	−9.0	
1926	469,700	30,440	15,260	15,180	64.8	32.5	32.3	−9.3	
1927	480,900	31,230	15,520	15,710	65.0	32.3	32.7	−9.6	
1928	492,400	32,020	15,740	16,280	65.0	32.0	33.1	−9.9	
1929	504,200	32,840	15,960	16,880	65.2	31.7	33.5	−10.3	
1930	516,400	33,680	16,180	17,500	65.2	31.3	33.9	−10.5	
1931	516,400	25,830	15,920	9,910	50.0	30.8	19.2	−19.2	
1932	523,800	26,240	15,610	10,630	50.1	29.8	20.3	−6.3	
1933	531,200	27,160	15,530	11,630	51.1	29.2	21.9	−8.1	
1934	538,900	28,020	15,440	12,580	52.0	28.6	23.4	−9.2	
1935	546,900	28,930	15,310	13,620	52.9	28.0	24.9	−10.4	
1936	555,100	29,820	15,240	14,580	53.7	27.5	26.2	−11.7	
1937	563,500	30,610	15,360	15,250	54.3	27.3	27.0	−12.3	
1938	571,900	31,500	15,480	16,020	55.1	27.1	28.0	−13.5	
1939	580,400	32,460	15,660	16,800	55.9	27.0	29.0	−14.5	
1940	588,900	33,300	16,020	17,280	56.5	27.2	29.3	−15.1	
1941	597,300	34,110	16,510	17,600	57.1	27.6	29.5	−15.6	
1942									
1943									
1944									
1945									
1946	638,000	33,600	16,200	17,400	52.7	25.4	27.3		
1947	938,000	39,600	21,400	18,200	42.2	22.8	19.4	441.7	
1948	967,000	41,900	20,900	21,000	43.3	21.6	21.7	8.5	
1949	997,000	44,800	20,200	24,600	44.9	20.3	24.6	5.6	
1950	1,028,000	47,500	19,900	27,600	46.2	19.4	26.8	3.4	
1951	1,060,000	50,900	18,600	32,300	48.0	17.5	30.5	−0.3	
1952	1,093,000	53,900	18,400	35,500	49.3	16.8	32.5	−2.4	
1953	1,128,000	56,600	18,300	38,300	50.2	16.2	34.0	−3.0	
1954	1,165,000	58,900	18,400	40,500	50.6	15.8	34.8	−3.1	
1955	1,204,000	60,200	18,900	41,300	50.0	15.7	34.3	−2.0	
1956	1,243,000	61,100	19,000	42,100	49.1	15.3	33.8	−2.6	
1957	1,317,000	66,800	19,200	47,600	50.7	14.6	36.1	21.2	
1958	1,388,000	65,400	19,600	45,800	47.1	14.1	33.0	19.1	
1959	1,463,000	64,800	20,200	44,600	44.3	13.8	30.5	21.9	
1960	1,646,400	61,775	10,210	51,565	37.5	6.2	31.3	90.1	5.76
1961	1,702,400	59,930	10,027	49,903	35.2	5.9	29.3	3.6	5.41
1962	1,750,200	58,977	10,178	48,799	33.7	5.8	27.9	−0.6	5.21
1963	1,795,000	59,530	10,138	49,392	33.2	5.6	27.5	−2.6	5.16
1964	1,841,600	58,217	10,434	47,783	31.6	5.7	25.9	−0.6	4.97
1965	1,886,900	55,725	10,263	45,462	29.5	5.4	24.1	−0.1	4.66
1966	1,934,400	54,680	10,444	44,236	28.3	5.4	22.9	1.7	4.46
1967	1,977,600	50,560	10,523	40,037	25.6	5.3	20.2	1.6	3.91
1968	2,012,000	47,241	10,982	36,259	23.5	5.5	18.0	−0.9	3.53
1969	2,042,500	44,562	10,224	34,338	21.8	5.0	16.8	−1.9	3.22
1970	2,074,507	45,934	10,717	35,217	22.1	5.2	17.0	−1.5	3.07
1971	2,122,900	47,088	11,329	35,759	22.3	5.4	16.8	6.0	3.02
1972	2,152,400	49,678	11,522	38,156	23.1	5.4	17.7	−4.0	3.04
1973	2,193,000	48,269	11,920	36,349	22.0	5.4	16.6	1.9	2.79
1974	2,229,800	43,268	11,674	31,594	19.4	5.2	14.2	2.3	2.35
1975	2,262,600	39,948	11,447	28,501	17.7	5.1	12.6	1.9	2.07
1976	2,293,300	42,783	11,648	31,135	18.7	5.1	13.6	−0.2	2.11
1977	2,325,300	38,364	11,955	26,409	16.5	5.1	11.4	2.4	1.82
1978	2,353,600	39,441	12,065	27,376	16.8	5.1	11.6	0.4	1.79
1979	2,383,500	40,779	12,468	28,311	17.1	5.2	11.9	0.7	1.79
1980	2,413,945	41,217	12,505	28,712	17.6	4.9	11.9	0.7	1.82
1981	2,532,835	42,250	12,863	29,387	17.6	4.9	11.6	48.6	1.78
1982	2,646,466	42,654	12,896	29,758	17.5	4.9	11.2	14.2	1.74
1983	2,681,061	40,585	13,321	27,264	16.3	5.0	10.2	9.2	1.61
1984	2,732,221	41,556	13,162	28,394	16.5	4.8	10.4	2.5	1.62
1985	2,735,957	42,484	13,348	29,136	16.6	4.9	10.6	−11.4	1.61
1986	2,733,373	38,379	12,821	25,558	14.8	4.6	9.4	5.9	1.43
1987	2,774,789	43,616	13,173	30,443	16.6	4.7	11.0	1.9	1.62
1988	2,846,108	52,957	13,690	39,267	19.8	4.9	13.8	2.2	1.96
1989	2,930,901	47,669	14,069	33,600	17.5	4.9	11.5	2.3	1.75
1990	3,047,132	51,142	13,891	37,251	18.2	4.7	12.2	4.2	1.83
1991	3,135,083	49,114	13,876	35,238	17.1	4.6	11.2	7.0	1.73
1992	3,230,698	49,402	14,337	35,065	16.8	4.7	10.9	4.7	1.72
1993	3,313,471	50,225	14,461	35,764	16.8	4.6	10.8	2.1	1.74
1994	3,419,048	49,554	14,946	34,608	16.2	4.7	10.1	2.1	1.71
1995	3,524,506	48,635	15,569	33,066	15.6	4.8	9.4	2.3	1.67
1996	3,670,704	48,577	15,590	32,987	15.2	4.7	9.0	3.1	1.66
1997	3,796,038	47,333	15,305	32,028	14.5	4.5	8.4	3.0	1.61
1998	3,927,213	43,664	15,657	28,007	13.1	4.6	7.1	3.1	1.48
1999	3,958,723	43,336	15,516	27,820	12.8	4.5	7.0	1.4	1.47
2000	4,027,887	46,997	15,693	31,304	13.7	4.5	7.8	4.2	1.60
2001	4,138,012	41,451	15,367	26,084	11.8	4.3	6.3	20.3	1.41
2002	4,175,950	40,760	15,820	24,940	11.4	4.4	6.0	−2.3	1.37
2003	4,114,826	37,485	16,036	21,449	10.5	4.5	5.2	2.5	1.27
2004	4,166,664	37,174	15,860	21,314	10.3	4.4	5.1	2.5	1.26
2005	4,265,762	37,492	16,215	21,277	10.2	4.4	5.0	4.8	1.26
2006	4,401,365	38,317	16,393	21,924	10.3	4.4	5.0	7.2	1.28
2007	4,588,599	39,490	17,140	22,350	10.3	4.5	4.9	8.2	1.29
2008	4,839,396	39,826	17,222	22,604	10.2	4.4	4.7	8.2	1.28
2009	4,987,573	39,570	17,101	22,469	9.9	4.3	4.5	2.7	1.22
2010	5,076,732	37,967	17,610	20,357	9.3	4.4	4.0	4.2	1.15
2011	5,183,688	39,654	18,027	21,627	9.5	4.5	4.2	5.2	1.20
2012	5,312,437	42,663	18,481	24,182	10.1	4.5	4.6	4.9	1.29
2013	5,399,162	39,720	18,938	20,782	9.3	4.6	3.8	2.9	1.19
2014	5,469,724	42,232	19,393	22,839	9.8	4.7	4.2	2.6	1.25
2015	5,535,002	42,185	19,862	22,323	9.7	4.8	4.0	9.0	1.24
2016	5,607,283	41,251	20,017	21,234	9.4	4.8	3.8	−2.9	1.20
2017	5,612,253	39,615	20,905	18,710	8.9	5.0	3.3	1.4	1.16
2018	5,638,676	39,039	21,282	17,757	8.8	5.0	3.1	8.4	1.14
2019	5,703,569	39,279	21,446	17,833	8.8	5.0	3.1	−6.2	1.14
2020	5,685,807	38,590	22,054	16,536	8.5	5.2	2.9	−43.8	1.10
2021	5,453,566	38,672	24,292	14,380	8.6	5.8	2.6	31.0	1.12
2022	5,637,022	35,605	26,891	8,714	7.9	6.3	1.5	48.2	1.04
2023	5,917,648	33,541	26,888	6,653	7.4	6.2	1.1	19.0	0.97
2024	6,036,860	33,703	26,442	7,261	7.4	6.0	1.2	18.6	0.97
2025	6,111,175	30,004	26,499	3,505	6.5	6.0	0.6	11.7	0.87

=== Current vital statistics ===
Period	Live births	Deaths	Natural increase
January–September 2025	22,519	19,748	+2,771
January–September 2026	21,044	20,548	+496
Difference	▼ −1,475 (−6.6%)	▲ +800 (+4.1%)	▼ −2,275

=== Fertility ===
Years	1883	1884	1885	1886	1887	1888	1889	1890	1891	1892
Total Fertility Rate in Singapore	5.17	5.28	5.39	5.51	5.62	5.73	5.71	5.69	5.68	5.66

Years	1893	1894	1895	1896	1897	1898	1899
Total Fertility Rate in Singapore	5.64	5.62	5.60	5.58	5.57	5.55	5.53

== Ethnic groups ==
=== Post-independence ===
In the post-independence period after 1965, Singapore's population has been broadly classified into four main groups: Chinese, Malays, Indians and Others, a category that consists largely of Eurasians. These groups collectively shape the country's contemporary cultural and social landscape, influencing its cuisine, languages, religions and traditions that are regarded as distinctive to Singapore. The CMIO framework was first proposed in 1956 during British colonial rule as a way to structure the education system around four designated national languages.

Although immigration was a major driver of population growth in Singapore during the colonial period, by the mid-20th century growth became dominated by native births and accelerated following World War II. After Singapore's separation from Malaysia in 1965, the free movement of people between the two countries ended, and net immigration fell to a low of 24,000 in the decade from 1970 to 1980 due to tighter immigration controls by the Singaporean government. Meanwhile, fertility among the Chinese population declined sharply after the post-war boom, while fertility among the Malay population remained relatively high. As a result, the Malay share of the population increased to 14.5% in the late-1960s, reversing a long period of decline during the British colonial period.

From the 1980s onwards, the government's immigration policy shifted, leading to a sharp increase in the number of immigrants, which once again became an important driver of population growth in Singapore. By the period from 1990 to 2000, immigration had overtaken natural population growth, accounting for nearly two-thirds of the decadal increase with 640,571 net migrants, including non-residents. While the racial composition of citizens has remained relatively constant over the decades, slight shifts are observed in the figures for residents (citizens plus permanent residents). A smaller proportion of immigrants were Malays, resulting in a decline in the percentage of Malays among the resident population. By contrast, the proportion of Indian residents rose to 9.2% in 2010, an increase from 7.4% among citizens alone, largely due to the inflow of migrant workers from South Asia particularly in the construction sector.

The population profile of Singapore changed significantly after the relaxation of immigration policy from the 1980s, with a sharp increase in the number of transient foreigners. Official figures show that the number of non-residents grew from 30,900 in 1970 to 1,641,600 in 2020, representing about a 53-fold increase over 50 years. Their share of the total population rose from 2.9% in 1970 to 28.9% in 2020. Despite this, no further breakdown of the non-resident population (such as by ethnic origin) is publicly provided by Singstat. It is widely assumed that this group comprises individuals from a broad range of countries who generally do not fit into the CMIO classification, which may explain the lack of detailed categorisation. By the mid-2020s, it was estimated that more than 40% of Singapore's total population were of foreign origin, being both permanent residents and non-residents, including foreign workers, students and their dependants, among others.

Proportion of non-residents out of total population
	1970	1980	1990	2000	2010	2020	2025	2026
Non-residents (Residents = Citizens + PRs)	2.9%	5.5%	10.2%	18.7%	25.7%	28.9%	31.2%	31.8%

Ethnic composition of resident population (Citizens + PRs)
	Chinese	Malays	Indians	Others
1970	77.0%	14.8%	7.0%	1.2%
1980	78.3%	14.4%	6.3%	1.0%
1990	77.8%	14.0%	7.1%	1.1%
2000	76.8%	13.9%	7.9%	1.4%
2010	74.1%	13.4%	9.2%	3.3%
2020	74.3%	13.5%	9.0%	3.2%
2025	73.9%	13.5%	9.0%	3.5%
2026	73.9%	13.5%	9.0%	3.6%

Population pyramids of ethnic group residents in 2020

Chinese

Malays

Indian

Other

Overseas Citizens (outside of census figures)

Chinese Resident Ropulation by Detailed Ethnic Group (2025)
Ethnic group	Population	Percentage
Hokkien	1,193,900	38.4%
Teochew	585,609	18.8%
Cantonese	436,613	14%
Hakka	270,431	8.7%
Hainanese	182,868	5.9%
Foochow	61,710	2%
Henghua	26,778	0.9%
Shanghainese	22,454	0.7%
Hockchia	16,940	0.5%
Other Chinese	311,772	10%
Total	3,109,075	

Malay Resident Population by Detailed Ethnic Group (2025)
Ethnic group	Population	Percentage
Malay	382,978	67.3%
Javanese	97,489	17.1%
Boyanese	61,398	10.8%
Other Malays	27,269	4.8%
Total	569,134	

Indian Resident Population by Detailed Ethnic Group (2025)
Ethnic group	Population	Percentage
Tamil	208,367	55%
Malayali	27,640	7.3%
Hindi	22,128	5.8%
Sikh	12,535	3.3%
Other Indians	108,428	28.6%
Total	379,098	

Resident Population of Other Ethnic Groups by Detailed Ethnic Group (2025)
Ethnic group	Population	Percentage
Filipino	33,658	22.9%
White	32,044	21.8%
Eurasian	19,641	13.3%
Burmese	12,674	8.6%
Arab	9,218	6.3%
Thai	8,712	5.9%
Others	31,261	21.2%
Total	147,208	

Total fertility rate by ethnic group
Year	Chinese	Malays	Indians	Total
1980	1.73	2.20	2.03	1.82
1990	1.65	2.69	1.89	1.83
2000	1.43	2.54	1.59	1.60
2010	1.02	1.65	1.13	1.15
2020	0.94	1.82	0.96	1.1
2024	0.83	1.58	0.91	0.97
2025	0.70	1.53	0.92	0.87

=== Pre-independence ===
Singapore, following its founding as a British free port by Stamford Raffles in the 19th century, did not have a sizeable native population as the population became dominated by three main groups of immigrants. When Raffles arrived in Singapore in January 1819, Singapore had approximately 120 Malays, 30 Chinese and some native tribes (Orang Laut) under the rule of the Temenggung. Around 100 of the Malays had originally moved to Singapore from the mainland (Johor) in 1811, led by the Temenggung. Other estimates place the then population of Singapore at 1,000, belonging to various local tribes. Early census figures show a long influx of migrant workers into the country, initially consisting mostly of Malays, but shortly thereafter followed by the Chinese. By 1821, the population was estimated to have increased to 4,724 Malays and 1,150 Chinese.

In the first census of 1824, 6,505 out of the 10,683 total were Malays and Bugis, constituting over 60% of the population. Large number of Chinese migrants started to enter Singapore just months after it became a British settlement, and they were predominantly male. In 1826, official census figures give a total population of 13,750, with 6,088 Chinese, 4,790 Malays, 1,242 Bugis, 1,021 Indians from Bengal (244) and the Coromandel Coast (777), smaller number of Javanese (267), Europeans (87) and other peoples. The population total of Singapore increased to 16,000 in 1829, 26,000 five years later. By 1836, the Chinese at 13,749 had become the most populous ethnic group, overtaking the broad Malay grouping (12,538, including other groups such as the Bugis, Javanese, and Balinese from the Dutch East Indies). By 1849, the population had reached 59,043, 24,790 of them Chinese.

Many of the migrants from China in the 19th century came to work on the pepper and gambier plantations, with 11,000 Chinese immigrants recorded in one year. Singapore became one of the entry and dispersal points for large number of Chinese and Indian migrants who came to work in the plantations and mines of the Straits Settlements, many of whom then settled in Singapore after their contract ended. By 1860, the total population had reached around 90,000, of these 50,000 were Chinese, and 2,445 Europeans and Eurasians. The first thorough census in Singapore was undertaken in 1871, and the people were grouped into 33 racial, ethnic or national categories, with Chinese forming the largest group at 57.6%.

Censuses were then conducted at 10-year intervals afterwards. The 1881 census grouped the people into 6 main categories, and further subdivided into 47 sub-categories. The 6 broad groups were given as Europeans, Eurasians, Malays, Chinese, Indians and Others in 1921. The Malays group included other natives of the Malay archipelago, the Europeans included Americans, the Indians would be people from the Indian subcontinent including what are now Pakistan and Bangladesh. In 1901, the total population of Singapore was 228,555, with 15.8% Malays, 71.8% Chinese, 7.8% Indians, and 3.5% Europeans and Eurasians. The Chinese population figure of Singapore has stayed at over 70% of the total since, reaching 77.8% in 1947. After dropping from a peak of 60% in the early years of Singapore, the Malay population settled within the range of 11 and 16% in the first half of the 20th century, while Indians hovered between 7 and just over 9% in the same period.

Population of colonial era Singapore
Ethnic group	Population^{A}						
Ethnic group	1824	1826	1836	1871	1901	1931	1957
Europeans	74	87	141	1,946	3,824	8,082	10,826
Eurasians			117	2,164	4,120	6,903	11,382
Native Christians^{B}		188	421				
Armenians	16	19	34			(81)	
Arabs	15	26	41				
Malays^{C}	4,580	4,790	9,632	26,148	36,080	65,014	197,059
Bugis	1,925	1,242	1,962^{D}				
Javanese		267	903				
Chinese	3,317	6,088	13,749	54,572	164,041	418,640	1,090,596
Indians	756	1,021	2,930	11,610	17,824	50,811	124,084
Others^{E}		12	50	671	2,667	8,275	11,982
Total	10,683	13,750	29,980	97,111	228,555	557,745	1,445,929

- ^A Population figures do not include transient populations of military personnel and convicts
- ^B Mostly of Portuguese descent
- ^C Include other peoples of the Malay Archipelago if figures not given separately
- ^D Include Balinese
- ^E Include Cafres, Siamese, Parsis, Jews, and other groupings if figures not given separately.

Annual growth rate for main ethnic groups in selected periods
Ethnic group	1824–1830	1849–1860	1881–1891	1901–1911	1931–1947
Chinese	12.0%	5.4%	3.5%	3.0%	3.5%
Malays	2.9%	5.2%	0.1%	1.5%	3.6%
Indians	6.7%	6.8%	2.9%	5.0%	1.9%

== Languages ==
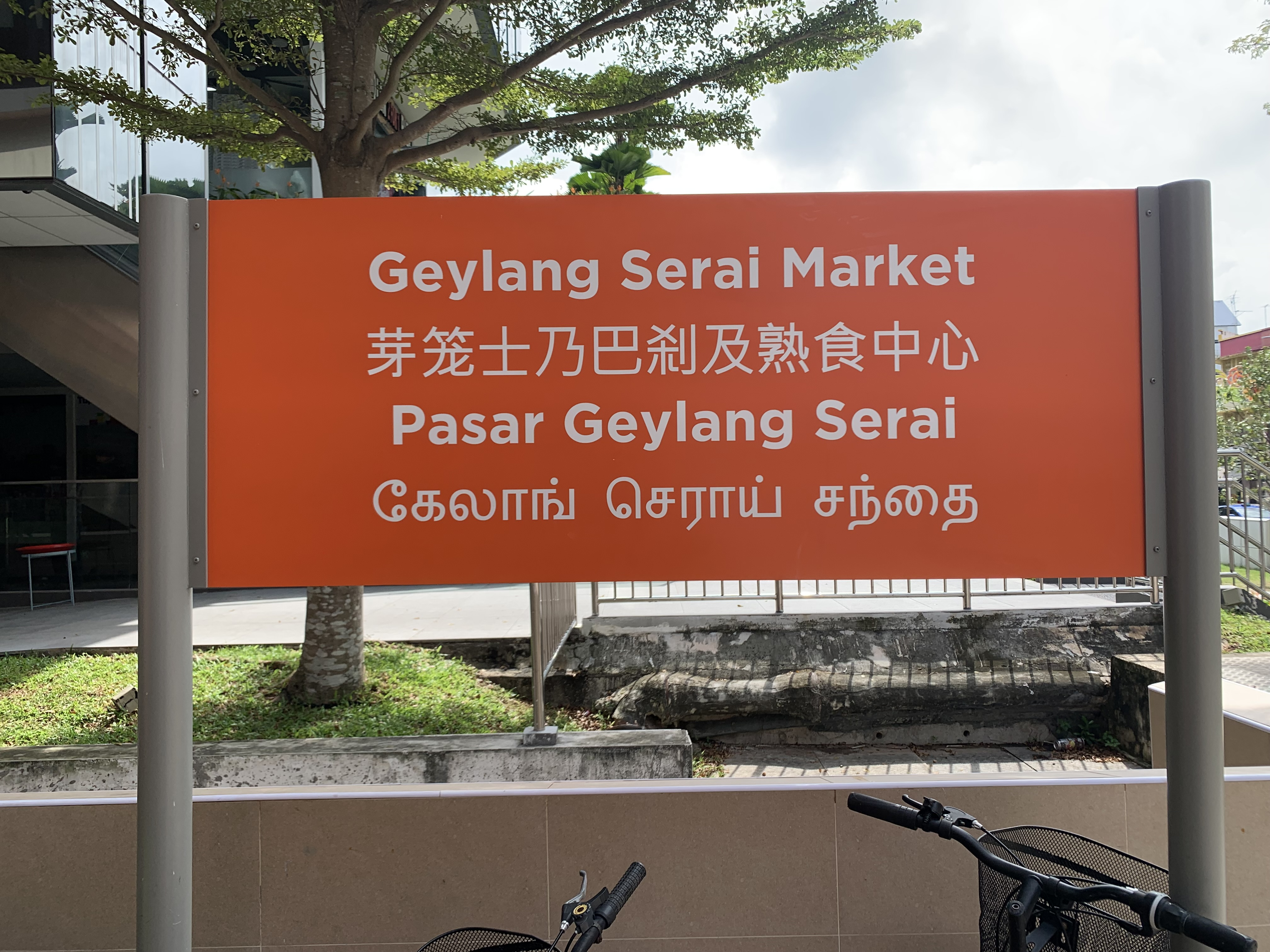
A quadrilingual sign written in Singapore's four official languages; English, Mandarin, Malay and Tamil for the Geylang Serai Market

Languages of Singapore (2025)
Languages	percent
English	58.1%
Mandarin Chinese	26.6%
Malay	7.0%
Non-Mandarin Chinese varieties	4.9%
Tamil	2.2%
Others	1.3%

Singapore has four official languages: English, Malay, Mandarin and Tamil.

Malay is the national language of the country, although English is the official language used in the educational system and by the government. The colloquial English-based contact language used in everyday life is often referred to as Singlish, spoken by all races of Singapore.

The government of Singapore promotes the use of Mandarin. The use of other Chinese varieties, like Hokkien, Teochew, Cantonese and Hakka, has been declining over the last two decades, although they are still being used especially by the older generations of the Chinese population.

About 60% of Indian Singaporeans are Tamils although the percentage of those who speak Tamil at home has been declining, with around 37% of Singaporean Indians speaking Tamil at home according to the 2025 General Household Survey. Other spoken Indian languages are Punjabi, Malayalam, Hindi and Bengali, but none of them alone is spoken by more than 10% of the Indian Singaporeans. As with Chinese Singaporeans, a large proportion of Chinese Singaporeans speak English at home.

Around 5,000 to 10,000 Peranakans, the early Chinese population of the region, still use the Hokkien-influenced Malay dialect called Baba Malay.

Languages of Singapore most frequently spoken at home
Year	English	Mandarin Chinese	Malay	Non-Mandarin Chinese varieties	Tamil	Others
1980	11.6%	10.2%	13.9%	59.5%	3.1%	1.7%
1990	20.3%	26.0%	13.4%	36.7%	2.9%	0.7%
2000	23.0%	35.0%	14.1%	23.8%	3.2%	0.9%
2010	32.3%	35.6%	12.2%	14.3%	3.3%	2.3%
2020	48.3%	29.9%	9.2%	8.7%	2.5%	1.4%
2025	58.1%	26.6%	7.0%	4.9%	2.2%	1.3%

== Religion ==
Religion in Singapore (2025 General Household Survey)
1. Buddhism (30.9%)
2. No religion (23.9%)
3. Christianity (17.1%)
4. Islam (15.0%)
5. Taoism (7.30%)
6. Hinduism (5.40%)
7. Sikhism (0.31%)
8. Other religions (0.09%)

The main religions of Singapore among residents are Buddhism, Taoism, Christianity, Judaism, Islam, Hinduism, and Sikhism, with a significant number who profess no religion.

Singapore, being a secular state, has freedom of religion, although the government restricts some religions such as Jehovah's Witnesses, due to their opposition to conscription. The majority of Malays are Muslim, while the plurality of Chinese practise Buddhism and syncretic Chinese folk traditions. Christianity is growing in the country. Taoism was overtaken as the second-most prominent religion in the 2000 census among the Chinese as more have increasingly described themselves as Buddhists rather than Taoist. Indians are mostly Hindus, though many are Muslims, Sikhs, and Christians. People who practise no religion form the second largest group in Singapore.

== Marriage and divorce ==
Marriages and divorces
	1980	1990	2000	2010	2020	2023	2024	2025
Number of marriages (excluding previously married)	20,905	21,044	18,233	18,007	17,789	21,887	20,545	19,233
Number of divorces	1,551	3,150	4,920	6,969	6,708	6,849	7,078	6,946
Median age of first marriage (years)
...Grooms	26.7	28.0	28.7	30.0	30.4	31.0	31.1	31.1
...Brides	23.6	25.3	26.2	27.7	28.8	29.5	29.6	29.6
General marriage rate
...Males (per 1,000 unmarried resident males aged 15 to 49)	54.9	52.2	47.4	39.3	35.7	44.3	42.0	39.1
...Females (per 1,000 unmarried resident females aged 15 to 49)	67.3	59.2	46.8	35.3	34.9	43.1	40.1	38.1
Median age at divorce (years)
...Grooms	34.0	35.9	39.0	41.0	43.2	44.5	44.4	44.3
...Brides	30.8	32.6	35.5	37.4	39.5	40.8	40.9	41.2
General divorce rate
...Males (per 1,000 married resident males aged 20 years and over)	3.7	6.1	6.5	7.5	6.3	6.0	6.3	6.1
...Females (per 1,000 married resident females aged 20 years and over)	3.8	6.1	6.5	7.2	6.1	5.5	5.7	5.8
Crude marriage rate (per 1,000 resident population)	9.8	8.6	6.7	6.1	5.2	6.4	5.9	5.5
Crude divorce rate (per 1,000 resident population)	0.8	1.3	1.6	1.9	1.7	1.7	1.7	1.7
Percentage of inter-ethnic marriages		7.4%	11.5%	17.4%	16.9%	18.1%	19.1%	19.2%

=== Marital status ===
Marital status of residents aged 15 and over (2025)
Marital status	Percentage of population	Number of residents
Married	61.7%	3,423,995
Never married	28.6%	1,035,900
Widowed	5.43%	196,800
Divorced	4.20%	152,200

== Literacy and education ==
Literacy rate population aged 15 years and above
Year	Total	Male	Female
1960	52.6%	70.3%	32.8%
1970	68.9%	83.0%	54.3%
1980	82.3%	91.4%	73.1%
1990	89.1%	95.1%	83.0%
2000	92.5%	96.6%	88.6%
2010	95.9%	98.0%	93.8%
2020	97.1%	98.5%	95.8%

Highest qualification attained of resident non-student population aged 25 years and over
Year	Below secondary	Secondary	Post-secondary (non-tertiary)	Diploma or professional qualification	University
2001	46.9%	24.1%	6.6%	8.9%	13.6%
2011	33.4%	19.6%	8.9%	13.6%	24.5%
2020	25.5%	16.3%	10.0%	15.3%	33.0%

Among residents aged 25–39 years, the percentage of university graduates increased from 23.7% in 2001 to 45.9% in 2011 while that who had attained a diploma or professional qualification increased from 15.9% to 22.9% over the same period.

== Employment ==
In 2005, the unemployment rate for persons aged 15 years and over was 2.5%, the lowest in the last four years, with a labour force of 2.3 million people.

Employment (thousands)
Year	Employment change											Employment in December 2012
Year	2002	2003	2004	2005	2006	2007	2008	2009	2010	2011	2012	Employment in December 2012
Total	−22.9	−12.9	71.4	113.3	176.0	234.9	221.6	37.6	115.9	122.6	129.1	3,357.6
Total (excluding foreign domestic workers)	−23.6	−11.7	66.4	105.5	168.0	223.5	213.4	32.9	110.6	117.7	125.8	3,148.0
Locals	19.4	14.9	49.9	63.5	90.9	90.4	64.7	41.8	56.2	37.9	58.7	2,089.3
Foreigners	−42.3	−27.9	21.5	49.8	85.1	144.5	156.9	−4.2	59.7	84.8	70.4	1,268.3
Foreigners (excluding foreign domestic workers)	−43.0	−26.6	16.5	42.0	77.1	133.1	148.7	−8.9	54.4	79.8	67.1	1,058.7

Unemployment rate (%) for persons aged 15 years and over
Year	Overall	Residents	Singapore citizens
2002	3.6%	4.8%	5.1%
2003	4.0%	5.2%	5.4%
2004	3.4%	4.4%	4.8%
2005	3.1%	4.1%	4.4%
2006	2.7%	3.6%	3.7%
2007	2.1%	3.0%	3.1%
2008	2.2%	3.2%	3.4%
2009	3.0%	4.3%	4.5%
2010	2.2%	3.1%	3.4%
2011	2.0%	2.9%	3.0%
2012	2.0%	2.8%	3.0%
2013	2.0%		
2014	2.0%		

== Household income ==
=== Average household monthly income ===
The average household monthly income was SGD 4,943 in 2000, which was an increase of $3,080 in 1990 at an average annual rate of 4.9%. The average household income experienced a drop of 2.7% in 1999 due to economic slowdown. Measured in 1990 dollars, the average household monthly income rose from SGD$3,080 in 1990 to SGD$4,170 in 2000 at an average annual rate of 3.1%.

Household income from work (SGD)
Year	1990	1995	1997	1998	1999	2000	2010	2011	2017
Average income	3,076	4,107	4,745	4,822	4,691	4,943	8,726	9,618	11,589
Median income	2,296	3,135	3,617	3,692	3,500	3,607	5,600	6,307	8,846

Households income from work by ethnic group per head (SGD)
Ethnic group	Average household income			Median household income			
Ethnic group	1990	2000	2010	1990	2000	2010	2020
Total	3,076	4,943	7,214	2,296	3,607	5,000	7,744
Chinese	3,213	5,219	7,326	2,400	3,848	5,100	7,792
Malays	2,246	3,148	4,575	1,880	2,708	3,844	5,704
Indians	2,859	4,556	7,664	2,174	3,387	5,370	8,500
Others	3,885	7,250		2,782	4,775		

=== Household income distribution ===
Resident households by monthly household income from work including employer CPF contributions (%)
Year	2000	2001	2002	2003	2004	2005	2006	2007	2008	2009	2010	2011	2012	2013	2014	2015	2016	2017	2018	2019
No working person	8.6	6.9	9	9.7	9.8	10	9	8.6	8.6	9.6	10.5	9.3	9.2	9.4	10.4	9.7	10.8	11.8	12.1	13.2
Retiree households	2.6	2.3	3	3.6	3.7	3.5	4.1	4.1	3.8	4	4.1	4.5	4.7	4.9	5.7	5.3	6.1	6.9	7.1	7.9
Below $1,000	3.3	3.9	4	4.6	4.3	4.3	4.4	4.3	3.8	4.1	3.5	3.2	3	2.7	2.3	2	2	1.9	1.9	1.8
$1,000–$1,999	12.2	11.1	11.5	11.1	11.4	10.9	10.5	9.8	8.3	7.8	7	6.5	6.2	6.2	5.9	5.7	5.5	5.4	5.3	5.1
$2,000–$2,999	13.2	12.7	12.5	11.9	12.2	11.4	11.2	10	8.6	8.6	8.2	7.1	6.3	6.3	5.8	5.8	5.4	5.1	5.2	4.9
$3,000–$3,999	12.6	11.5	11.6	11.7	11.4	10.7	10.8	9.7	8.5	8.9	8.3	7.6	6.6	6.7	6	5.5	5.3	5.5	5.2	5.2
$4,000–$4,999	10.2	9.8	9.5	9.4	9.6	9.1	8.9	8.8	8.4	8.1	7.9	7.2	7	6.3	5.9	5.9	5.4	5.2	5.3	5.4
$5,000–$5,999	8.3	8.3	8.1	7.9	7.9	7.9	8.1	7.7	7.3	7.5	7.4	7	6.8	6.4	6.1	5.7	5.9	5.4	5.4	4.9
$6,000–$6,999	6.7	6.7	6.4	6.9	6.3	6.4	6.9	6.8	6.4	6.9	6.7	6.5	6.1	5.8	5.8	5.8	5.8	5.2	5.2	4.9
$7,000–$7,999	5.1	5.3	5.1	4.9	5.3	5.4	5.3	5.7	5.9	5.7	5.7	6	5.8	5.6	5.4	5.3	5.1	5.2	4.6	4.6
$8,000–$8,999	4	4.3	4.3	4	4.1	4.5	4.4	4.7	5.1	4.7	5.1	5.4	5.4	5.1	5.1	5.3	4.9	5	4.7	4.6
$9,000–$9,999	3.1	3.5	3.3	3.4	3.3	3.4	3.5	3.8	4.1	4.1	4.2	4.7	4.7	4.6	4.7	4.8	4.6	4.6	4.4	4.1
$10,000–$10,999	2.4	2.9	2.8	2.7	2.7	2.8	2.9	3.3	3.8	3.7	3.8	4.1	4.1	4.4	4.7	4.3	4.6	4.3	4.3	4.2
$11,000–$11,999	1.8	2.1	2.1	1.9	1.9	2.1	2.3	2.6	3.2	2.9	3	3.3	3.8	3.7	3.6	3.8	3.8	3.6	3.8	3.8
$12,000–$12,999	1.5	1.8	1.5	1.5	1.5	1.8	1.9	1.9	2.4	2.4	2.6	2.7	3.3	3.4	3.3	3.6	3.5	3.2	3.2	3.4
$13,000–$13,999	1.1	1.4	1.2	1.4	1.3	1.4	1.5	1.9	2	2.2	2.1	2.4	2.6	2.8	3	3	3	3	3.2	3
$14,000–$14,999	0.9	1.1	1.1	1.1	1	1.1	1.2	1.4	1.7	1.8	1.8	2.1	2.2	2.6	2.6	2.7	2.6	2.7	2.6	2.8
$15,000–$17,499	1.6	2	1.8	1.9	1.8	2.1	2	2.6	3.2	3.2	3.5	4.2	4.6	4.7	4.9	5.2	5.5	5.6	5.8	5.4
$17,500–$19,999	1	1.4	1.2	1.1	1.2	1.3	1.4	1.7	2.2	2.1	2.2	2.8	3.1	3.3	3.5	3.8	4	4.1	4.2	4.1
$20,000 and over	2.4	3.2	2.8	3	2.9	3.4	3.8	4.7	6.4	5.7	6.6	8	9.2	9.9	11	12.1	12.4	13.3	13.5	14.4

Resident households by monthly household income from work excluding employer CPF contributions (%)
Year	2000	2001	2002	2003	2004	2005	2006	2007	2008	2009	2010	2011	2012	2013	2014	2015	2016	2017	2018	2019
No working person	8.6	6.9	9	9.7	9.8	10	9	8.6	8.6	9.6	10.5	9.3	9.2	9.4	10.4	9.7	10.8	11.8	12.1	13.2
Retiree households	2.6	2.3	3	3.6	3.7	3.5	4.1	4.1	3.8	4	4.1	4.5	4.7	4.9	5.7	5.3	6.1	6.9	7.1	7.9
Below $1,000	3.9	4.4	4.6	5.2	4.8	4.8	4.9	4.7	4	4.3	3.7	3.4	3.2	2.9	2.4	2.2	2.1	2.1	2	2
$1,000–$1,999	13.8	13.3	13.6	13	12.9	12.3	11.9	10.9	9.5	9	8.2	7.5	7	7.2	6.7	6.6	6.4	6.2	6.1	5.9
$2,000–$2,999	14.7	14.2	14.1	13.9	13.6	12.7	12.4	11.2	9.8	9.9	9.3	8.3	7.3	7.2	6.7	6.5	6	6	6	5.5
$3,000–$3,999	13.1	12.6	12.4	12.2	12.2	11.5	11.3	10.6	9.7	9.9	9.3	8.3	7.7	7.4	7	6.7	6.4	6.2	6	6.2
$4,000–$4,999	10.3	10	9.8	9.7	9.8	9.4	9.5	9.2	8.9	8.5	8.6	8.2	8	7.4	6.8	6.5	6.5	6.1	6.3	5.8
$5,000–$5,999	8.2	8.3	7.9	8.2	7.8	7.9	8.2	7.9	7.6	8.2	7.8	7.5	7.3	6.9	6.7	6.7	6.7	6.3	6	6
$6,000–$6,999	6.3	6.3	6.1	6	6	6.3	6.4	6.7	6.4	6.7	6.6	6.7	6.4	6.3	6.1	6.1	6	5.8	5.5	5.4
$7,000–$7,999	4.6	4.7	4.8	4.6	4.8	5	4.9	5.3	5.9	5.2	5.6	6	5.9	5.8	5.7	5.9	5.6	5.7	5	5
$8,000–$8,999	3.5	3.9	3.6	3.6	3.8	3.9	3.9	4.2	4.6	4.6	4.8	5.2	5.3	5	5.2	5	5.3	5	5.2	4.6
$9,000–$9,999	2.6	3	2.9	2.6	2.7	2.8	3	3.4	3.9	3.7	3.9	4.2	4.2	4.6	4.7	4.5	4.5	4.5	4.4	4.5
$10,000–$10,999	2.1	2.2	2.3	2.2	2.1	2.4	2.6	3	3.4	3.4	3.4	3.7	4.2	4.3	4	4.3	4.3	3.9	4.2	4.2
$11,000–$11,999	1.5	1.7	1.3	1.5	1.6	1.8	1.9	1.9	2.5	2.4	2.6	2.7	3.2	3.3	3.3	3.5	3.5	3.4	3.6	3.5
$12,000–$12,999	1.2	1.4	1.3	1.3	1.4	1.5	1.6	2	2	2.3	2.2	2.5	2.6	3	3.1	3.2	3	3	3.1	3.2
$13,000–$13,999	0.9	1.1	1	1.1	1	1.2	1.2	1.5	1.6	1.8	1.8	2.1	2.3	2.5	2.5	2.7	2.8	2.7	2.7	2.6
$14,000–$14,999	0.7	0.8	0.7	0.7	0.7	0.9	0.9	1.1	1.4	1.4	1.5	1.8	1.9	2.1	2.3	2.2	2.3	2.4	2.4	2.4
$15,000–$17,499	1.3	1.6	1.5	1.4	1.5	1.7	1.6	2.1	2.7	2.6	2.8	3.6	3.8	4	4.1	4.4	4.6	4.9	5.1	4.8
$17,500–$19,999	0.8	1.1	1	0.9	0.9	1	1.3	1.5	1.8	1.6	1.8	2.2	2.6	2.6	2.9	3.2	3.3	3.4	3.2	3.5
$20,000 and over	2	2.5	2.2	2.3	2.5	2.9	3.4	4.2	5.5	4.9	5.7	6.8	7.7	8.3	9.2	10.1	9.9	10.7	11.1	11.7

=== Growth in household income by decile ===
With the recovery from the 1998 economic slowdown, household income growth had resumed for the majority of households in 2000. However, for the lowest two deciles, the average household income in 2000 had declined compared with 1999. This was mainly due to the increase in the proportion of households with no income earner from 75% in 1999 to 87% in 2000 for the lowest 10%. Households with no income earner include those with retired elderly persons as well as unemployed members.

Average monthly household income from work including employer CPF contributions among resident employed households(SGD)
Decile	Average monthly household income (SGD)															Nominal annual change (%)													
Decile	2000	2001	2002	2003	2004	2005	2006	2007	2008	2009	2010	2011	2012	2013	2014	2001	2002	2003	2004	2005	2006	2007	2008	2009	2010	2011	2012	2013	2014
Total	5,947	6,417	6,229	6,276	6,285	6,593	6,792	7,431	8,414	8,195	8,726	9,618	10,348	10,469	11,143	7.9	−2.9	0.8	0.1	4.9	3.0	9.4	13.2	−2.6	6.5	10.2	7.6	1.2	6.4
1st – 10th	1,382	1,331	1,266	1,223	1,232	1,257	1,258	1,321	1,399	1,361	1,497	1,581	1,644	1,711	1,775	−3.7	−4.9	−3.4	0.7	2.0	0.1	5.0	5.9	−2.7	10.0	5.6	4.0	4.1	3.7
11th – 20th	2,241	2,275	2,180	2,164	2,199	2,257	2,305	2,418	2,700	2,696	2,940	3,135	3,302	3,372	3,641	1.5	−4.2	−0.7	1.6	2.6	2.1	4.9	11.7	−0.1	9.1	6.6	5.3	2.1	8.0
21st – 30th	2,986	3,043	2,944	2,984	2,988	3,116	3,182	3,379	3,831	3,787	4,158	4,421	4,782	4,993	5,226	1.9	−3.3	1.4	0.1	4.3	2.1	6.2	13.4	−1.1	9.8	6.3	8.2	4.4	4.7
31st – 40th	3,683	3,867	3,722	3,746	3,786	4,020	4,038	4,335	4,906	4,978	5,418	5,794	6,183	6,376	6,863	5.0	−3.7	0.6	1.1	6.2	0.4	7.4	13.2	1.5	8.8	6.9	6.7	3.1	7.6
41st – 50th	4,505	4,680	4,572	4,637	4,648	4,859	4,971	5,358	6,055	5,980	6,603	7,032	7,608	7,993	8,303	3.9	−2.3	1.4	0.2	4.5	2.3	7.8	13.0	−1.2	10.4	6.5	8.2	5.1	3.9
51st – 60th	5,304	5,677	5,522	5,638	5,504	5,865	6,027	6,561	7,492	7,319	7,840	8,436	9,133	9,469	10,108	7.0	−2.7	2.1	−2.4	6.6	2.8	8.9	14.2	−2.3	7.1	7.6	8.3	3.7	6.7
61st – 70th	6,354	6,751	6,664	6,725	6,633	7,136	7,180	7,928	8,957	8,798	9,310	10,101	10,894	11,293	11,861	6.2	−1.3	0.9	−1.4	7.6	0.6	10.4	13.0	−1.8	5.8	8.5	7.9	3.7	5.0
71st – 80th	7,608	8,322	8,132	8,229	8,012	8,641	8,809	9,479	10,820	10,694	11,105	12,306	13,186	13,807	14,496	9.4	−2.3	1.2	−2.6	7.9	1.9	7.6	14.1	−1.2	3.8	10.8	7.2	4.7	5.0
81st – 90th	9,461	10,755	10,294	10,271	10,350	10,701	11,048	12,386	14,013	13,423	13,943	15,509	16,366	16,984	18,017	13.7	−4.3	−0.2	0.8	3.4	3.2	12.1	13.1	−4.2	3.9	11.2	5.5	3.8	6.1
91st – 100th	15,946	17,467	16,998	17,146	17,493	18,076	19,100	21,146	23,968	22,909	24,442	27,867	30,379	28,688	31,142	9.5	−2.7	0.9	2.0	3.3	5.7	10.7	13.3	−4.4	6.7	14.0	9.0	−5.6	8.6

Average monthly household income from work excluding employer CPF contributions among resident employed households(SGD)
Decile	Average monthly household income (SGD)													Nominal annual change (%)											
Decile	2000	2001	2002	2003	2004	2005	2006	2007	2008	2009	2010	2011	2012	2001	2002	2003	2004	2005	2006	2007	2008	2009	2010	2011	2012
Total	5,456	5,736	5,572	5,618	5,761	6,052	6,280	6,889	7,752	7,549	8,058	8,864	9,515	5.1	−2.9	0.8	2.5	5.1	3.8	9.7	12.5	−2.6	6.7	10.0	7.3
1st – 10th	1,285	1,209	1,151	1,112	1,140	1,162	1,165	1,223	1,300	1,264	1,385	1,460	1,518	−5.9	−4.8	−3.4	2.5	1.9	0.3	5.0	6.3	−2.8	9.6	5.4	4.0
11th – 20th	2,062	2,040	1,956	1,942	2,009	2,064	2,114	2,218	2,464	2,462	2,679	2,834	2,985	−1.1	−4.1	−0.7	3.5	2.7	2.4	4.9	11.1	−0.1	8.8	5.8	5.3
21st – 30th	2,737	2,717	2,627	2,668	2,721	2,833	2,903	3,078	3,464	3,436	3,759	3,988	4,290	−0.7	−3.3	1.6	2.0	4.1	2.5	6.0	12.5	−0.8	9.4	6.1	7.6
31st – 40th	3,367	3,434	3,312	3,330	3,431	3,645	3,673	3,950	4,420	4,495	4,887	5,200	5,529	2.0	−3.6	0.5	3.0	6.2	0.8	7.5	11.9	1.7	8.7	6.4	6.3
41st – 50th	4,097	4,149	4,043	4,103	4,200	4,390	4,514	4,870	5,455	5,391	5,959	6,303	6,800	1.3	−2.6	1.5	2.4	4.5	2.8	7.9	12.0	−1.2	10.5	5.8	7.9
51st – 60th	4,830	5,015	4,884	4,981	4,978	5,301	5,477	5,962	6,753	6,601	7,090	7,587	8,196	3.8	−2.6	2.0	−0.1	6.5	3.3	8.9	13.3	−2.3	7.4	7.0	8.0
61st – 70th	5,773	5,971	5,891	5,936	6,005	6,458	6,535	7,234	8,107	7,972	8,450	9,147	9,806	3.4	−1.3	0.8	1.2	7.5	1.2	10.7	12.1	−1.7	6.0	8.2	7.2
71st – 80th	6,919	7,365	7,187	7,273	7,256	7,846	8,046	8,694	9,849	9,733	10,142	11,193	11,973	6.4	−2.4	1.2	−0.2	8.1	2.5	8.1	13.3	−1.2	4.2	10.4	7.0
81st – 90th	8,631	9,557	9,144	9,142	9,443	9,797	10,203	11,491	12,916	12,354	12,887	14,307	15,038	10.7	−4.3	0.0	3.3	3.7	4.1	12.6	12.4	−4.4	4.3	11.0	5.1
91st – 100th	14,862	15,905	15,524	15,688	16,425	17,021	18,170	20,174	22,797	21,784	23,345	26,622	29,012	7.0	−2.4	1.1	4.7	3.6	6.8	11.0	13.0	−4.4	7.2	14.0	9.0

=== Household income ratio ===
The disparity in household income had widened in 2000, reflecting the faster income growth for the higher-income households.

Gini coefficient among resident employed households
Year	2000	2001	2002	2003	2004	2005	2006	2007	2008	2009	2010	2011	2012
Household income from work excluding employer CPF contributions per household member	0.444	0.456	0.457	0.460	0.464	0.470	0.476	0.489	0.481	0.478	0.480	0.482	0.488
Household income from work including employer CPF contributions per household member	0.442	0.454	0.454	0.457	0.460	0.465	0.470	0.482	0.474	0.471	0.472	0.473	0.478
Household income from work including employer CPF contributions per household member after accounting for government transfers and taxes	0.434	0.437	0.433	0.446	0.446	0.449	0.444	0.467	0.449	0.448	0.452	0.448	0.459

Ratio of household income from work per household member at the 90th percentile to 10th percentile among resident employed households
Year	2000	2001	2002	2003	2004	2005	2006	2007	2008	2009	2010	2011	2012
Household income from work excluding employer CPF contributions per household member	7.74	8.68	8.49	8.51	8.81	9.26	9.3	9.52	9.61	9.25	9.43	9.12	9.18
Household income from work including employer CPF contributions per household member	7.75	8.58	8.82	8.81	8.87	9.06	9.23	9.38	9.64	9.43	9.35	9.19	9.14
Household income from work including employer CPF contributions per household member after accounting for government transfers and taxes	7.68	7.82	7.71	8.28	8.24	8.3	7.68	8.68	7.94	8.00	8.1	7.54	7.87

== See also ==
- Singaporeans
- Malay Singaporeans
- Chinese Singaporeans
- Indian Singaporeans
- Arab Singaporeans
- Eurasians in Singapore
- Population planning in Singapore
