= Social Development Network =

Former Singaporean government dating agency

The Social Development Network (SDN), formerly of Social Development Unit (SDU) and Social Development Service (SDS), was a governmental body under the Ministry of Social and Family Development of Singapore. It worked with the community and commercial sectors to foster opportunities for single people to interact in social settings in Singapore. Besides coordinating and facilitating dating activities offered by the private sector, it also served to educate the public on singlehood issues. Other responsibilities of the SDN included providing the necessary infrastructure and support for the dating industry, as well as ensuring the professionalism of dating agencies through an accreditation council that was formed in 2007. In November 2023, the body shut down.

SDN's initial role in the industry was to organise activities for its members to interact. In 2006, SDU changed focus to accredit and fund private matchmaking and dating services agencies and projects. This was done with the hope of creating a more vibrant dating scene and of allowing singles to have more options to interact with others of different educational levels.

== History ==
A census conducted in 1980 revealed that a large number of highly educated women were still unmarried, despite being above 40 years of age. It was also noted that there was an inverse relationship between a person's educational level and the number of children he/she had. Minister of Finance and Trade and Industry Tony Tan attributed this finding to two factors: firstly, the cultural attitude among local men, who preferred to marry women with lower educational qualifications than themselves; and secondly, the preference among female university graduates to marry men who were better educated or at least of the same educational level as themselves. Since then, a "Great Marriage Debate" had been raging.

During the 1983 National Day Rally, Prime Minister Lee Kuan Yew said Singapore's talent pool would decline and better-educated Singaporeans need to get married and have more children. He alleged that the phenomenon of graduates remaining single would result in a projected loss of about 400 talented people per year. This estimation was made on the basis that talent was not so much nurtured as it was conceived, as studies at that time had shown. Lee had also expressed worry that the dearth of children produced by graduate women would lead to the faltering of the economy and ultimately a decline in society. Lee promised that tough measures would be taken by the government to curb the problem.

The SDU was formed in January 1984 to provide opportunities for single men and women to interact socially. Another objective of the unit was to encourage public discussion about the perceived problem of the large number of better-educated women remaining unmarried. In October that year, Minister for Finance Tony Tan said that 700 people had benefited from activities by the SDU. Since it was first established, SDU's target group was limited to university graduates. The government justified this elitist approach by announcing that they had identified graduates—and in particular the females among them—as a group which required assistance in terms of finding lifelong partners. According to the government, non-graduates did not seem to have any difficulty in finding partners. However, the Social Development Service (SDS) was set up a year after the SDU to promote marriages among non-graduates.

In 2006, SDU became an accrediting body, accrediting private dating services and funding them via the Partner Connection Fund. Dating agency such as Lunch Actually and dating apps such as Singapore-based Paktor received support from the fund.

On 28 January 2009, the SDU and SDS merged to become a single entity, tentatively named SDU-SDS, consolidating their respective resources and exposing their constituent members to the larger, merged database. It was renamed as Social Development Network (SDN) on 16 October.

In 2012, the SDN website was created and became a platform for singles to obtain dating information and joining SDN events.

In October 2023, SDN emailed its members information of its shutdown and in November, shut down its website.

== Public response ==
Public reaction to the former SDU was initially that of disdain; graduate women were unhappy about their plight being addressed so prominently, while non-graduate women and their parents were upset at the government for dissuading graduate men from marrying them. There was also an outcry by the public at large about the unfair use of taxpayers' money to subsidise leisure activities for graduates, especially since they already had a higher income. Some were also displeased about the fact that civil servants who were single were given three extra days of leave to go on SDU-organised cruises.

Besides those who treated the SDU with contempt, there were others who simply did not take the SDU seriously. One popular joke that was conceived in the early days was that 'SDU' also stood for 'Single, Desperate and Ugly'.

== Results and success rates ==
=== Within the SDU ===
Results in the beginning were slow and the effectiveness of the SDU was questioned by both the public and members of parliament. From the time it was established in January 1984 to March 1985, only 2 marriages had taken place as a result of the SDU's efforts. This was not proportionate to the amount that SDU had spent on its activities, which came to $294,411.32 at the time. However, marriage figures began to increase from there. Between March and July 1985, another 4 couples were married. Since then, the number of SDU marriages has increased over the years. By the end of the first decade, the number of marriages as a result of SDU activities averaged about 1,000 a year. In 2003, SDU reported a significant increase in marriage figures for its members over the years, from 2,789 in 1999 to 4,050 in 2003. Over the first 2 decades since the SDU was first set up, SDU reported that more than 33,000 members were married (This includes Singaporeans who would have married irrespective of SDU).

=== On the national level ===
Despite the promising numbers reported by SDU, statistics at the national level do not mirror the trends within the SDU. According to the Singapore Department of Statistics, there was only a slight increase in marriages from 22,561 in year 2000 to 22,992 in year 2005. In fact, for those aged 30–34, the proportion remaining single had increased significantly between 2000 and 2005, as more people chose to delay marriage. In 2005, among citizens aged 30–34, the proportion that was single was 37 per cent for males and 26 per cent for females. As for those in the age range of 40–44, the proportion single at 2005 remained high at 15–17 per cent for males and females collectively.

The number of marriages has steadily increased over the years from 2004 (22,189) to 2009 (26,081) and crude marriage rate (per 1000 resident population) has been on the rise from 6.4 in 2007 to 6.6 in 2009. However, more singles are also marrying later. The mean age for first marriage has increased from 28.7 to 29.8 (males) and 26.2 to 27.5 (females) over the last 10 years.

=== Survey results ===
In addition to marriage and membership statistics, surveys are also conducted by the SDU from time to time to assess the effectiveness of the SDU, and its public education objective in particular. In mid 2006, 2,041 university undergraduates and polytechnic students were polled in an SDU survey on undergraduates' attitudes towards social interaction, dating and marriage. The data, which was collected during a series of face-to-face interviews, showed that, while nine out of ten would like to get married, only 35 per cent of them were certain about their intentions.

Earlier in the same year, SDU had conducted another survey which assessed attitudes of singles in general towards courtship and marriage. The survey, which included a variety of age groups, showed that 81 per cent of the 1,800 respondents indicated that they would like to get married. Yet, 74 per cent of the singles also mentioned that achieving success in work and studies was their top priority.

In the Survey on Singles' Attitudes towards Courtship and Marriage conducted by the Social Development Network (SDN) in 2009, about 80% of more than 1500 singles surveyed indicated their intention to get married. However, respondents also cited "not finding the right one or someone who met my expectations" as the top key reason for delaying marriage. Other top reasons cited included "not enough opportunities to socialize" and "lack of time" as career and other commitments were viewed as more/equally important, or as milestones to be achieved in life before they would think about marriage.

== Activities and events ==
In the beginning, activities that the former SDU organised included personal-effectiveness workshops, computer courses, barbecues, dancing lessons, cruises/tours to the Maldives, Club Mediterrannee and Japan. SDU's policy then was that part of the fees for courses would be sponsored by the unit, while the full costs had to be borne by participants for cruises. However, it was discovered that the costs of cruises were significantly below the market rates and that participants were granted leave by their companies for the duration of the cruise.

Activities offered by SDU included dating, wine and dine events, self-development, sports, recreation and travel. The range of activities offered became much more extensive over the years. Self-development activities consisted mostly of dance lessons, though these span from Hip Hop to Exotic Dance to Ballroom Waltz. Other self-development courses included wine appreciation, Pilates and baking classes. Overseas trips to many parts of Asia (such as China, Thailand, Malaysia, Vietnam and Nepal) were offered under the Travel category and the length of tours ranged from one day to 18 days, catering to different budgets and interests. SDU members are entitled to a subsidised rate for most activities, regardless of the nature of the event.

In the 2000s, SDN started funding university orientation camps. After risque games during such camps drew public anger, SDN publicly disapproved of such games and would retract funding if camps do not stop such games. In 2016, SDN stopped funding the camps.

After 2009, SDN worked with different partners from the people, private and public sectors to create a broad array of opportunities for singles to meet and form meaningful relationships. Apart from collaborating with Government agencies under the Social Development Officers (SDO) Network to provide small interaction activities for single employees in the civil service, SDN also partners selected commercial and community organisations to facilitate larger-scale events for singles.

In 2012, SDN introduced an annual SGD 100 dating credit scheme to subsidize singles attending approved dating events organized by accredited agencies. It had also pushed for family and friends of singles to buy their dating vouchers for the singles.

== Membership ==
When SDU was first started, membership was free of charge and valid until the member registered his/her marriage, either at the Registry or under the Muslim law. Members paid only for the activities they registered for and even then, the costs were subsidised by the government. Many revisions have since been made to the various membership schemes, including an annual membership fee.

From October 2009, all membership schemes were removed and SDN extended its benefits to all resident singles without any fees. Singles aged 20 and above who are Singapore Citizens and Permanent Residents could join the network's database to receive communications and information on dating, or register as a user to enjoy its online services, such as the chat function, forum discussion and personal ads, or to access information on events and other resources on dating and relationships.

== Project Network ==
Project Network was an initiative that was started by the SDN in 2003 to provide funding for programmes helmed by local universities to promote social skills or provide socialisation opportunities for undergraduates. In order for projects to qualify for funding, they had to satisfy one of two conditions:

1. Opportunities for interaction between the two genders are maximised
2. Undergraduates are taught social networking skills for personal development

The amount of funding that was provided depended on several factors, such as gender balance (the bare minimum being 60–40%), the originality of the programme, the degree of reach as well as the extent to which participants could benefit from the social interaction. As of 30 March 2007, the SDN had funded a total of about $275,000 worth of social activities.

Through Project Network, SDN helped to co-fund orientation camps and student activities organised by the local universities to facilitate more gender-balanced social interaction opportunities on campus. Official student bodies could apply for the fund if they meet the criteria of the funding scheme.
