= List of ambassadors of Singapore to Russia =

Singapore Ambassador to Russia
- Посол Сингапура в России
- Incumbent; Neo Ek Beng Mark since August 14, 2023; 3 years ago
- Precursor: Singapore Ambassador to the Soviet Union
- Inaugural holder: P S Raman
- Formation: 1971; 55 years ago

The Singapore ambassador to Russia (Russian: Посол Сингапура в России, romanized: Posol Singapura v Rossii) is the official representative of the Republic of Singapore to the Russian Federation.

== List of representatives ==
Ambassador	Tenure
P S Raman	1971–1976
Joseph Francis Conceicao	1977–1981
Ho Guan Lim	1981–1984
Kemal Siddique	1984–1986
Chiang Hai Ding	1986–1989
Joseph Francis Conceicao	1990–1994
Bilahari Kausikan	1994–1995
Mark Hong Tat Soon	1995–2002
Michael Tay Cheow Ann	2002–2008
Simon Tensing de Cruz	2008–2012
Lim Kheng Hua	2012–2019
Premjith Sadasivan	2019–2023
Neo Ek Beng Mark	2023–present

== See also ==
- Russia–Singapore relations
- List of ambassadors of Russia to Singapore
- List of ambassadors of Singapore
