= Lock Han Chng Jonathan v Goh Jessiline =

Lock Han Chng Jonathan v. Goh Jessiline
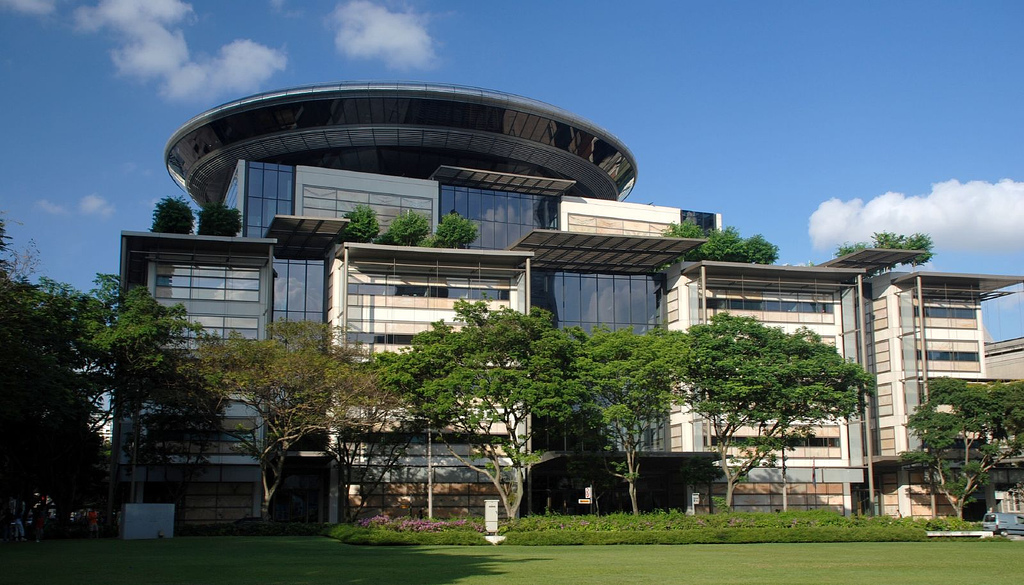
- Court: Court of Appeal of Singapore
- Full case name: Lock Han Chng Jonathan (Jonathan Luo Hancheng) v. Goh Jessiline
- Decided: 31 December 2007
- Citation: [2008] 2 S.L.R.(R.) 455

Case history
- Prior action: M.C. Suit No. 21830 of 2005; [2007] 3 S.L.R.(R.) 51, High Court

Court membership
- Judges sitting: Chan Sek Keong C.J., Andrew Phang and V. K. Rajah JJ.A.

Case opinions
- Settlements made at the Primary Dispute Resolution Centre of the Subordinate Courts of Singapore are binding, and can be included in a court order for enforcement purposes.; All parties to pay own costs except Lock; his former lawyer to be investigated for possible breach of professional duties.

Lock Han Chng Jonathan v. Goh Jessiline was a court case decided in the Court of Appeal of Singapore on 31 December 2007 which concerned the validity of settlements made at the Primary Dispute Resolution Centre (PDRC) of the Subordinate Courts of Singapore.

The case was highly publicized in the media for the absurdities in the legal process leading up to the appeal, which ballooned from a compensation payment of S$187.50 to over $120,000 in legal costs over a minor vehicle accident. In particular, one of the appeal judges, Justice V. K. Rajah, expressed to one of the lawyers representing Goh's insurers NTUC Income that "you used a sledgehammer to crack a nut, when all you needed was a nutcracker."

The court decided that all parties were to bear their own legal costs except appellant Jonathan Lock, who could not be billed by his ex-lawyer Andrew Hanam without the court's permission and who was to have his legal costs for the appeal paid by NTUC Income. The Chief Justice also directed the Law Society of Singapore to investigate Hanam's professional conduct. The court upheld the PDRC's decisions in dispute resolution to be binding in subsequent court orders.

== Background to the case ==
In November 2004, Jonathan Lock's second-hand BMW motorcycle was involved in a minor collision with Jessiline Goh's Toyota car. Both vehicles were insured by NTUC Income. Following the dispute resolution process in the Primary Dispute Resolution Centre, Lock was awarded compensation of S$187.50 plus legal costs while Goh was ordered to pay about $1,200 in costs. Lock's then lawyer Andrew Hanam applied for a writ of summons and seizure to be issued against Goh.

Due to disagreements over S$60 (approx. US$40) in Lock's legal costs, Madan Asomull, the lawyer for Goh's insurer challenged the order on three occasions in the High Court on the basis that the decisions made by PDRC were unenforceable since it was not a court of law. On the third attempt, Justice Lai Siu Chiu agreed with Asomull and ordered Lock to pay S$45,000 in costs to NTUC Income (brought down from an initial S$63,000 after appeal).

Lock, who was unaware of the proceedings following the PDRC resolution, suddenly found himself having to pay the costs awarded against him. His plight was publicized in the media when the writ of summons and seizure was reversed against him, which made him liable to significant personal losses.

Shortly after Lock's plight was made public, insurer NTUC Income's CEO Tan Suee Chieh offered to waive the costs awarded against Lock and give him $25,000 to settle his legal costs as a gesture of goodwill, on the condition that Lock dropped his stated intention to appeal. Initially overjoyed, Lock was billed S$80,000 by his lawyer, Andrew Hanam, shortly after his dismissal, so he decided to turn down the offer and to proceed to the Court of Appeal, the highest court in the jurisdiction of Singapore. He also filed a civil suit against his former lawyer alleging that he provided inadequate professional services, in response to which the latter filed a counter-suit for defamation.

== Judgment ==
The court overturned Justice Lai's High Court decision, determining that the PDRC was indeed a court of law. Justice Andrew Phang pointed out that, having been set up by former Chief Justice Yong Pung How, it was part of the Subordinate Courts of Singapore and should be viewed as an integrated process, one that allows disputes to be settled more easily. The judges also censured both NTUC Income's lawyers and Hanam for escalating the case.

Chief Justice Chan Sek Keong in his judgment :

This case should never have come this far. It would not, if the solicitors in this case had acted reasonably in the interests of their clients. A dispute involving a puny sum of about $60 escalated into contests of wills between two solicitors, resulting in wastage of judicial time and unnecessary expenditure in terms of court fees and disbursement which exceeded $100,000 even before the date of this hearing.

This is an incredible case. We have not seen one like it in all our years in the law. It has brought no credit to counsel involved and the legal system as a whole.

All that the appellant wanted from the defendant was $375 [sic] being $485 for the cost of repairs to his car and $90 for loss of use, for which he eventually agreed to settle at $187.50. For this, he was put at risk of having to pay a sum in excess of $100,000 in legal fees.

Chief Justice Chan also directed the Registrar of the Supreme Court to refer an investigation of Hanam's professional conduct to the Council of the Law Society of Singapore. The judgment also specifically prohibited Hanam from billing Lock for any legal costs without the permission of the Court of Appeal. In addition, all parties were to pay their own legal costs except Lock who was to have his paid by NTUC Income.

== Consequences ==
Despite losing the appeal insurer NTUC Income decided to raise their goodwill offer towards Lock to S$40,000, an S$15,000 increase from the pre-appeal offer. The company in their press release admitted to lapses in their internal processes, and regretted the process the Lock family had had to go through. Shortly after the court's decision, Lock stated "my confidence in the legal system has been restored. I'm truly proud to be a Singaporean."

Three days after the decision, The Straits Times reported that Lock was considering dropping his civil suit against Hanam, and had filed a motion for the suit to be delayed since Chief Justice Chan had ordered an investigation into Hanam's professional conduct. In response Haman said that he was willing to drop his defamation countersuit, provided that Lock apologized for his actions.

Lock and Hanam eventually dropped their legal suits against each other, Lock's suit for professional misconduct by Hanam and Hanam's suit for defamation by Lock.
