= Lawrence Sia =

Former Singaporean trade unionist and politician

Member of the Singapore Parliament for Moulmein SMC
- In office 6 May 1968 – 14 August 1991
- Prime Minister: Lee Kuan Yew
- Preceded by: Avadai Dhanam Lakshimi
- Succeeded by: Constituency abolished

Personal details
- Born: Sia Khoon Seong; 10 November 1932 (age 93) Kuala Lumpur, Federated Malay States
- Party: People's Action Party
- Nickname: Chia Seong

Lawrence Sia Khoon Seong (Note: Chinese: 谢坤祥; Pe̍h-ōe-jī: Siā Khun-siông; pinyin: Xiè Kūnxiáng) (born 10 November 1932) is a former Singaporean teacher, trade unionist and politician. Sia was the president of the Singapore Teachers' Union from 1971, before being expelled in 2003. He also served as Member of Parliament for Moulmein from 1968 to 1991, and spoke about issues, such as education. In addition, Sia was deputy secretary-general of the National Trades Union Congress from 1970 to 1999.

== Early life and career ==
In 1932, Lawrence Sia Khoon Seong was born in Kuala Lumpur to a family with eight children and lived in a squatter hut at Kampung Baru. Sia received his early education at St. John's Institution (SJI), before attending St. Xavier's Institution and graduating with a Senior Cambridge. Inspired by one of his SJI teachers, Brother Lawrence, Sia decided to take on the additional name of Lawrence.

In March 1952, Sia migrated to Singapore and became a teacher, teaching at primary schools and secondary schools, such as Ama Keng English, Jurong Primary, Bartley Secondary and Naval Base, as well as Ponggol Vocational School. He stayed at St. Joseph's Church located in Bukit Timah, and paid S$60.00 a month for a place to stay and breakfast.

In 1965, Sia was elected as secretary-general of the Singapore Teachers' Union (STU). In 1967, Sia was promoted to become principal of First Toa Payoh Primary School and had to resign from STU to comply with its constitution.

On 20 March 1966, Sia was appointed as a member of the employee panel of the Industrial Arbitration Court.

== Political career ==
=== 2nd Parliament (1968–1972) ===
In the 1968 general elections, Sia, under the alias of Chia Seong, was among the three trade unionists fielded by the People's Action Party (PAP) in the constituency of Moulmein. The other two unionists were Eric Cheong and Seah Mui Kok, representing Toa Payoh and Bukit Ho Swee respectively. Both candidates were elected unopposed. Sia won 90.56% of the votes cast, and was elected into the 2nd Parliament on 6 May 1968.

In 1970, the Malaysia-Singapore Airlines (MSA) allegedly adopted a policy to prefer hiring white expatriates than locals with similar or better qualifications. As a member of the central committee of the National Trades Union Congress (NTUC), Sia called out MSA in Parliament, saying such nefarious policies have created dissatisfaction and lowered morale among locals, and warned that the Government's liberal policy of inviting qualified expatriates had been abused by certain industries. Sia elaborated in his speech on 19 March 1970:

The Singapore Air Transport Workers' Union has over the years battled strenuously for a concrete plan for nationalisation and a training programme for suitably qualified national staff to be groomed to replace expatriates. But with the recent changes in the structure of MSA management, more expatriates are being brought in. And now under the so-called scientific expatriate management, all kinds of dubiously qualified expatriates have been recruited.
Expatriates who had been scheduled to leave are promoted over more qualified national staff. Experienced national staff are switched around to their disadvantage under the guise of reorganisation in order to pave the way for establishing expatriate footholds.
All these nefarious activities have lowered the morale of MSA staff and have created a deep-seated frustration and disillusionment among the national staff who feel that qualifications and efficiency are not the prerequisites for promotion. This attitude can have far-reaching effects on national staff if steps are not taken to remedy this situation.

On 15 September 1970, NTUC Income was established and as deputy secretary-general of NTUC, Sia was appointed as one of the seven life trustees. The other trustees included acting Prime Minister and Minister for Defence Goh Keng Swee, Minister for Law and Minister for National Development Edmund W. Barker and NTUC secretary-general Devan Nair.

In March 1971, during a debate on budget proposals, Sia suggested three amendments to the Employment Act, namely to reduce the maximum duration of collective agreements in pioneering industries from five years to three years, raise the maximum limit for bonus negotiations from one month's salary to a more realistic sum, and raise employers' Central Provident Fund contributions. In August 1971, Sia called out the International Chamber of Commerce and the Singapore Employers' Federation for their "lukewarm response" towards the Government's plan to establish a national wage council.

On 14 April 1971, Sia was elected as president of the Singapore Teachers' Union. With the union present membership at 3,900, Sia announced an initiative to unionise about 12,000 English language teachers, and released a 10-point plan to improve teaching conditions.

=== 3rd Parliament (1972–1976) ===
In the 1972 general elections, Sia won 72.4% of the votes cast, and was elected into the 3rd Parliament on 12 October 1972. The other candidate was Cheng Poh Yew from the Workers' Party. During the elections, NTUC urged union workers to vote for the PAP candidates who were also NTUC union leaders, which included Sia.

In 1976, during a debate on the Government's education policy, Sia said that the "haphazard changes" to the education system had confused principals and teachers, and teachers should not be the scapegoat when problems arose. He elaborated in his speech towards Minister for Education Chua Sian Chin:

For goodness sake, can the minister inform this House whether the policy regarding the restructured education system and what it entails are thrown overboard or are still operative, in the light of the recent announcement by the present Minister for Home Affairs and Education that primary education will now extend up to a maximum of nine years for a slow learner with no automatic promotions?
Changes in our educational policy are desirable as we must keep up with the times and new demands, provided such changes are made after very careful consideration of the impact and implications they would have in the total context of our educational policy. But when changes were made and then retracted in some future time, it not only reflects the haphazard manner in which some of them were made, but also caused so much confusion among school principals and teachers as to what the educational policy makers really want, apart from causing a dislocation of existing education programmes in our schools.
In determining educational changes, one cannot be as fickle as a vain woman in her dressing room, changing now and then her mind about what she ought to wear for a party.

In April 1976, Sia was re-elected as deputy secretary-general of NTUC.

=== 4th Parliament (1976–1980) ===
In the 1976 general elections, Sia was once again fielded in Moulmein. The other candidates contesting were Ananthan Balakrishnan from the Workers' Party, and independent candidate Lee Nai Choo. Sia won 72.7% of vote cast and was elected to the 4th Parliament on 7 February 1977.

On 13 March 1978, Sia said that tax measures introduced by Minister for Finance Hon Sui Sen showed that he was capable of "inflicting pain" and "soothing away some of the pain" on taxpayers. Sia also felt that duty levied on cultural entertainment, such as concerts and movies, posed an "unnecessary burden" towards businesses, organisers and attendees. Sia elaborated in Parliament:

He has done the unexpected this year by decreasing income tax rates for the benefit of the taxpayers to the tune of S$53.9 million. This move certainly makes a lot of sense and brings good cheer to the taxpayers. Making sense and bringing good cheer, I must say, is not one of those things that the Finance Minister often does when it involves the giving away of money. This is clearly illustrated in the Finance Minister's rigid adherence to his ruling on the non-payment of the 13th Month Allowance, even on a prorate basis, to civil servants who retire or to their dependants if they die before the 31st December of each year.
Perhaps with the passage of time, the Finance Minister will develop a greater sense of generosity towards such civil servants or their dependants as the case may be, and a more propitious time may yet come when the Finance Minister will relent on this issue. Let us hope that this propitious time is not too far away.
Coming back to his tax measures, Mr Speaker, Sir, allow me to make certain observations in regard to the Finance Minister's proposal to increase the rate of entertainment duty. Like the Honorary Member for Jalan Kayu, I must point out here, with regret, that no distinction is made between nightclub entertainment on the one hand, and cultural and recreational entertainment, on the other. To impose an additional rate of entertainment duty on nightclub entertainment, including strip tease, lewd and sexy shows, is a proposal with which no one can find fault. But to impose an additional duty on admission charges for cultural entertainment, such as stage plays, concerts, music performances and dances, etc. is, I think, to put an unnecessary impediment in the way of the organisers and promoters of such cultural performances.
How much can Government get out of this additional duty? Is this additional duty really necessary to balance the Budget? The ordinary man must have his share of entertainment and recreation. Due recognition must be given to his right to such entertainment and recreation if we are earnest in what we say about caring, not only for his material well-being, but also his social needs. There is already a duty on admission charges.

=== 5th Parliament (1980–1984) ===
In the 1980 general elections, Sia was the sole candidate and was elected unopposed to the 5th Parliament on 3 February 1981. Once again, he was re-elected as deputy secretary-general of NTUC.

In the 1980s, Singapore faced a shortage of qualified teachers to provide quality education for students. In 1982, Sia questioned the Ministry of Education on spending S$800 million to construct schools when there were insufficient qualified teachers to man the schools. He also probed further and asked why the ministry was unable to solve the shortage. In Sia's opinion, the shortage could be solved by making teaching spiritually and financially attractive career, through a revision of salary and promotion for teachers.

=== 6th Parliament (1984–1988) ===
In the 1984 general elections, Sia was once again the sole candidate and was elected unopposed to the 6th Parliament on 25 February 1985.

In 1985, Sia was against the streaming policies, and advocated that all primary school students should be given the chance to take the Primary School Leaving Examination, and secondary school students in the normal stream should be able to sit for the Singapore-Cambridge GCE Ordinary Level without any criteria.

On 18 May 1985, Sia officially opened the Central Expressway, connecting the Pan Island Expressway to Thomson Road.

=== 7th Parliament (1988–1991) ===
In the 1988 general elections, Sia won 66.1% of votes cast and the other candidate, Ananthan Balakrishnan from the Workers' Party, had 33.9% of votes cast. On 9 January 1989, Sia was elected to the 7th Parliament.

In early 1991, Sia approached Prime Minister Goh Chok Tong and broached the issue of retiring from politics. Goh described Sia as an "unselfish man who know the pain of stepping down as a PAP MP", and was proud of his decision to make way for new candidates.

== Post-political career ==
Upon retiring from politics, Sia maintained his position of deputy secretary-general at NTUC. In 1994, he was nominated by patron Goh Chok Tong as a trustee for the Chinese Development Assistance Council.

In 1996, the Shanghai Singapore International School was established, and as president of the Singapore Teachers' Union (STU), Sia announced that STU will assist with designing the curriculum for the school, as well as maintaining the educational standards. Three primary schools, namely Henry Park, CHIJ (Toa Payoh) and CHIJ (Katong), were involved in designing lesson plans for English, mathematics and science. Sia pledged that STU will take on some responsibilities to help the Ministry of Education with its workload, provided the ministry recognised courses organised by the union.

In 1997, the Singapore education system started to change into an ability-driven one after Prime Minister Goh Chok Tong outlined his "Thinking Schools, Learning Nations" vision. Under this policy, more emphasis was given to national education, creative thinking, collaborative learning as well as ICT literacy. Sia warned that the policy must be implemented gradually, or else teachers may experience burnout. Many teachers agreed with Sia's sentiment. In response, Minister for Education Teo Chee Hean that problems associated with the introduction of new programmes were inevitable, and surveys conducted by the ministry suggested that teachers were adaptable and able to overcome any issues.

After almost 29 years of serving as deputy secretary-general at NTUC, Sia retired on 30 April 1999.

=== Singapore Teachers' Union ===
In April 2003, irregularities involving the handling of STU's NTUC Income sponsorship account surfaced, and 12 STU officials wanted Sia and two other leaders to be suspended. The account was set up in the 1980s to support the union's activities and consisted of surplus insurance claims from STU members. Sia claimed that the account belonged to the union. However, Tan Kin Lian, chief executive officer of NTUC Income, said that the funds in the account were not due to STU. Eventually, on 26 April 2003, Sia, along with the treasurer and deputy general secretary, was suspended and barred from the union's premises. On 30 April 2003, a lawyer's letter was sent to the 15 council members who voted them out. Sia alleged that the suspension was an attempt to stop any probe into the possible irregularities, and was illegal as well as against the union's rules and regulation.

In October 2003, Sia was expelled from the union. The union alleged that Sia, over the course 22 years, misled the union about the account and withheld financial information regarding the disbursement of funds worth between S$800,000 and S$900,000. The union also accused Sia of withdrawing over S$8,000 without approval, exceeding his annual spending limit of S$24,000 twice, and flying first class twice when he was only entitled to business class. Sia denied all the allegations, claiming that it was "totally false and unjustified". In his defence, Sia claimed that the S$8,000 was spent on staff meals, and he only exceeded his annual spending limit by S$2.00. Sia also claimed that no travel guideline was in place, so on the occasions he flew first class, it was done as the fare was cheaper than business class. On 25 October 2003, Sia appeared at the union's conference, but he was not allowed to fight his expulsion or argue his case.

On 27 January 2004, the High Court dismissed the lawsuit filed by Sia against the STU council members. In September 2005, STU ran a statement in its in-house magazine, stating that Sia "has honourably discharged his duties as president of STU and has at all times acted in good faith" and "is not guilty of criminal misconduct/misappropriation or criminal breach of trust." STU also withdrew all prior statements and allegations that suggested the contrary, and decided to give Sia an award recognising his contributions to the union. Sia did not accept the award.

== Personal life ==
Sia is a Catholic.

Sia and his wife, Gloria Sia Soo Lian PB, have two sons and a daughter. His wife was a teacher at Serangoon Garden South School, and died on 9 March 1999.

== Bibliography ==
- Sia, Lawrence (1976). "The impact of the NTUC on social development in Singapore". Clearing-House for Social Development in Asia. 2. Bangkok: Clearing-House.

== Notes ==
Parliament of Singapore
Preceded by Avadai Dhanam Lakshimi	Member of Parliament for Moulmein; 1968 – 1991	Constituency abolished
