= Russia–Singapore relations =

- Russia: Singapore

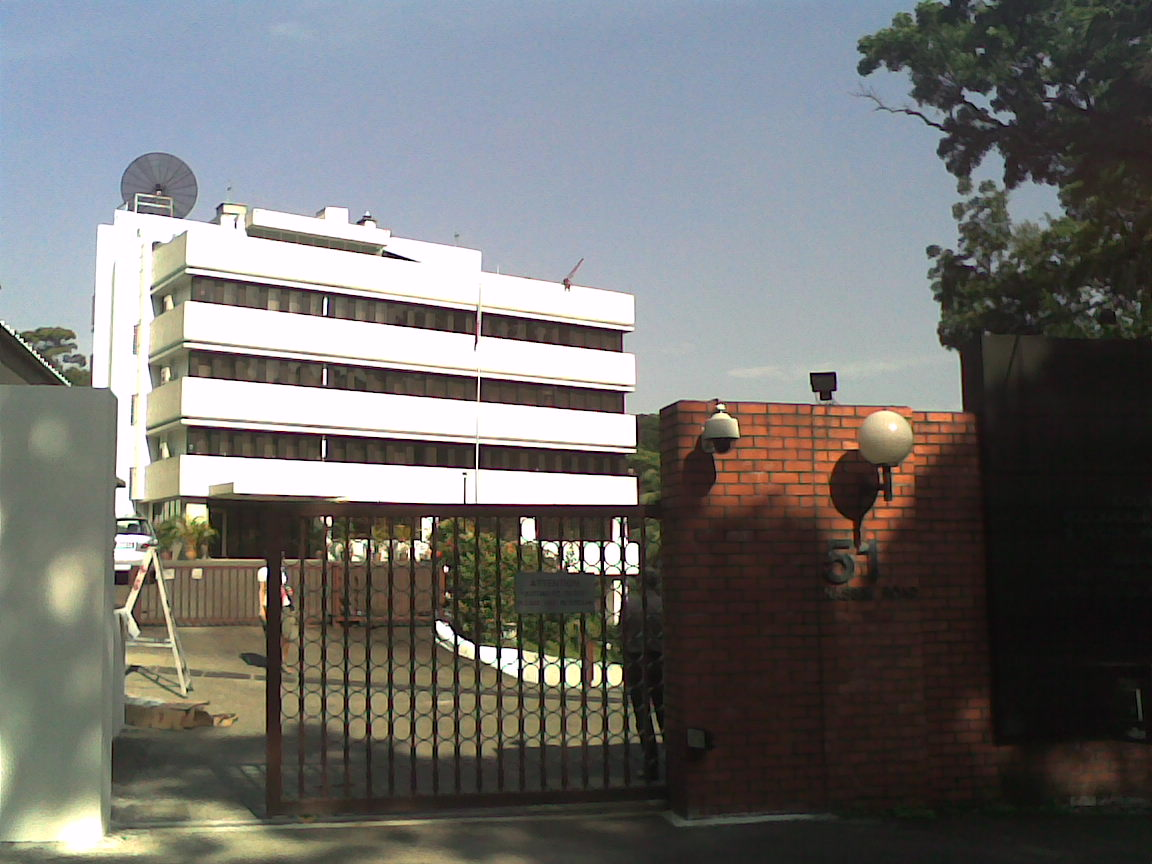
Russian embassy in Singapore

Russia–Singapore relations are the bilateral relations between Russia and Singapore. Russia has an embassy in Singapore. Singapore has an embassy in Moscow. Both countries are full members of APEC. Due to the 2022 Russian invasion of Ukraine, relations became very tense after Singapore imposed sanctions against Russia. Russia placed Singapore on a list of "unfriendly countries" along with Taiwan, South Korea, Japan, European Union members, NATO members (except Turkey), Ukraine, New Zealand, Switzerland, Micronesia and Australia.

== History ==
Russia appointed their first consul to Singapore, A.M. Vyvodtsev, in 1890, when the island was still a part of the British Empire as the Straits Settlements. Nicholas II of Russia visited the following year during his round-the-world voyage.

Singapore and the Soviet Union established full diplomatic relations on 1 June 1968.

In 2009, a Russian-Singapore political dialogue was conducted which gained intensity. Among the attendees were Russian President Dmitry Medvedev, Prime Minister Vladimir Putin and Chairman of the Federation Council, Sergey Mironov, among other Russian delegates, and Singapore Prime Minister Lee Hsien Loong, Minister Mentor Lee Kuan Yew, Senior Minister Goh Chok Tong and Deputy Prime Minister Teo Chee Hean, among other Singaporean delegates.

The first state visit by a Russian head of state to Singapore was in 2009, where Russian president Dmitry Medvedev visited Singapore on 15–16 November. President Dmitry met with President S. R. Nathan, Prime Minister Lee Hsien Loong and his cabinet. The Russian-Singapore Joint Statement on the State Visit of Russian President Dmitry Medvedev to Singapore determines the further steps to be taken to further enhance bilateral ties. One of the major results of the state visit of the Russian leader to Singapore was the establishment of the High-Level Russia-Singapore Inter-governmental Commission. The first and second sessions of the commission took place in Singapore, September 2010, and in Moscow, September 2011, respectively. Presently, the commission is co-chaired by the Deputy Prime Minister, Chief of Staff of the Government of the Russian Federation Vyacheslav Volodin and Deputy Prime Minister, Minister for Finance and Minister for Manpower of Singapore Tharman Shanmugaratnam. As Russian Prime Minister, Dmitry Medvedev most recently met Singapore Prime Minister Lee Hsien Loong again in November 2015 that noted increased trade between the two countries, and expanding economic activities by companies

Interparliamentary and interregional relations have also progressed in recent years. The ASEAN-Russian summit is held annually where leaders of member states meet with the Russian President.

The sixth annual Russia-Singapore Business Forum was held in Singapore in September 2011. The representatives of public and private sectors of Russia, Singapore, the Commonwealth of Independent States and the Asia-Pacific Region participated in the forum.

Russia and Singapore celebrated 50 years of diplomatic relations in 2018. Russian President Putin met with his counterpart President Halimah and was hosted to a state dinner. He also attended the ASEAN-Russia summit and the unveiling of the foundation stone of the Russian Cultural Center and a Russian Orthodox church.

== Economic relations ==
Trade and economy is the locomotive of bilateral cooperation. Besides bilateral trade which has exceeded more than 17 billion US dollars, investment, scientific and technological cooperation has received an additional impulse. An agreement between the Government of Singapore and the Government of Russia for the Avoidance of Double Taxation and the Prevention of Fiscal Evasion with Respect to Taxes on Income is applied to income derived on or after 1 January 2010. The Agreement on the Promotion and Reciprocal Protection of Investments was signed on 27 September 2010.

== Diplomatic incidents ==
=== 2022 Russian invasion of Ukraine ===
In the wake of the 2022 Russian invasion of Ukraine, Singapore's Ministry of Foreign Affairs said Singapore "strongly condemns any unprovoked invasion of a sovereign country under any pretext," and that "the sovereignty, independence and territorial integrity of Ukraine must be respected." "All parties concerned should continue to pursue dialogue, including diplomatic means, towards a peaceful settlement of the dispute, in accordance with international law, and avoid action that will further raise tensions in the region," the statement added. Local news outlets reported that Singapore may join international sanctions on Russia, and was unlikely to take a direct economic hit from export curbs on Russia.

On 28 February 2022, Singapore announced sanctions against Russia by imposing export controls on items "that can be used directly as weapons in Ukraine to inflict harm or to subjugate the Ukrainians" and moved to "block certain Russian banks and financial transactions connected to Russia". The move was a first by a Southeast Asian country and a departure from the Association of Southeast Asian Nations' refusal to condemn the invasion.

The move was described by retired Singaporean diplomat Bilahari Kausikan as "almost unprecedented" as the last time Singapore imposed unilateral sanctions was in 1978 after the Vietnamese invasion of Kampuchea.

Singapore's Foreign Minister Vivian Balakrishnan said, "It is all too easy for a small country to be caught up in the geopolitical games of big powers. Small countries must avoid becoming sacrificial pawns, vassal states or 'cat's paws' to be used by one side against the other."

"Unless we as a country stand up for principles that are the very foundations for the independence and sovereignty of smaller nations, our own right to exist and prosper as a nation may similarly be called into question", he said, in a 20-minute speech in parliament.

In response, the Embassy of Russia in Singapore said in a post on its Facebook page that it regretted Singapore's decision to join "Western anti-Russian sanctions that circumvent the UN Security Council and is contrary to the principled position of the country against imposing unilateral sanctions", adding that it "runs against the friendly relations between Russia and Singapore as well as counter to the need of speedy and #peaceful settlement of the situation in #Ukraine, which the Russian Federation continuously advocates."

External videos
- Speech by Singapore's Permanent Representative to the United Nations Burhan Gafoor, Youtube video

At the eleventh emergency special session of the United Nations General Assembly on 2 March 2022, Singapore was a co-sponsor of Resolution ES-11/1, which deplored the Russian invasion and demanded a full withdrawal of Russian forces as well as a reversal of its decision to recognise the self-declared People's Republics of Donetsk and Luhansk. The resolution was passed with 141 voting in favour, 5 against, and 35 abstentions. Singapore's Permanent Representative to the United Nations Burhan Gafoor delivered an uncharacteristically strong message, calling the "unprovoked invasion" by Russia "a clear and gross violation of the fundamental norms" as well as an "existential issue" for small countries like Singapore.

The relations between Singapore and Russia have become tense after on 7 March 2022, Russia placed Singapore on a list of "unfriendly countries" along with Taiwan, South Korea, Japan, European Union members, NATO members (except Turkey), Australia, New Zealand, Switzerland, Micronesia and Ukraine. All corporate deals with companies and individuals on this list would have to be approved by a government commission. A presidential decree on 5 March 2022 allowed the Russian government, companies and citizens to temporarily pay foreign currency debts owed to overseas creditors from "unfriendly countries" in rubles.

Russia imposed sanctions on EU, US and Singapore's energy firms on 12 May 2022.

== Diplomatic representation ==
In 1994, the Russian Federation appointed its first Ambassador to Singapore, M. M. Bely, who served from 1994 to 1999. In 1999, S. B. Kiselev became the second Ambassador to Singapore, followed by Andrey Rozhkov who served from 2005 to 2011. The current Russian Ambassador to Singapore is Sergey Ghanzha.

Singapore's first official representative to the Soviet Union was Chandra Das, who functioned in Moscow as Singapore's trade representative. The trade office was located in Hotel Ukraine in Moscow and on 4 May 1971, the embassy was open near the current Russian Ministry of Foreign Affairs. Singapore's first Ambassador to the Soviet Union was P. S. Raman, who was appointed on 15 July 1971 and presented his credentials to the Soviet Government on 30 July 1971. The current ambassador is Neo Ek Beng Mark since 14 August 2023.
