= Institute of Policy Studies (Singapore) =

Singaporean public policy institute

- Formation: 1988
- Type: Think tank, research institute
- Location: 1C Cluny Road House 5, Singapore 259599
- Director: Janadas Devan
- Patron: Goh Chok Tong
- Special Advisor: Tommy Koh
- Parent organization: Lee Kuan Yew School of Public Policy
- Website: lkyspp.nus.edu.sg/ips

The Institute of Policy Studies (IPS) is a think-tank that studies and generates public policy ideas in Singapore. It is an autonomous research centre of the Lee Kuan Yew School of Public Policy at the National University of Singapore.

== History ==
Established in 1988, IPS became an autonomous research centre of the Lee Kuan Yew School of Public Policy at the National University of Singapore in 2008. A centre for social indicators research, Social Lab, was set up by IPS in November 2013.

== Description and governance ==
Institute of Policy Studies (IPS) is a think-tank that studies and generates public policy ideas in Singapore.

The board of directors at the institute includes high ranking Singapore government officials, diplomats, directors of multinational businesses, and leaders of academic institutions.

== Research activities ==
IPS contributes to the research and analysis of domestic issues covering a wide range of topics and areas of study, focusing primarily on Singapore-centric subjects. The major areas of research include:

- Arts, culture, and media
- Demography and family
- Economics and business
- Politics and governance
- Society and identity

=== IPS Social Lab ===
A centre for social indicators research, Social Lab, was set up by IPS in November 2013. Its key project is a panel survey on social dynamics that tracks 5,000 households across Singapore.

== S R Nathan Fellowship for the Study of Singapore ==
In 2013, IPS set up the S R Nathan Fellowship for the Study of Singapore, named after the late former President of Singapore S R Nathan.

The S R Nathan Fellows include:

- Ho Kwon Ping (2014/15)
- Bilahari Kausikan (2015/16)
- Peter Ho (2016/17)
- Lim Siong Guan (2017/18 First Half)
- Cheong Koon Hean (2017/18 Second Half)
- Tan Tai Yong (2018/19)
- Chan Heng Chee
- Corinna Lim
- Ravi Menon
- Noeleen Heyzer
- Patrick Daniel
- Wang Gungwu
- Joseph Liow
- Tan Chong Meng
- Lily Kong
- Philip Yeo (2025)

=== IPS-Nathan Lectures ===
The S R Nathan Fellow contributes to IPS's research and analysis of Singapore public policy. They present their research findings and policy ideas by delivering between four and six public lectures over the course of the academic year.

== Flagship events ==
IPS hosts regular conferences, public lectures, seminars and closed door discussions.

=== Singapore Perspectives ===
Singapore Perspectives is IPS's annual conference that seeks to engage thinking Singaporeans in a lively debate about the public policy challenges the country faces. The first Singapore Perspectives conference was launched in 2000, replacing the earlier Year in Review conference series. Previous themes examined at the conference have included Governance, Differences and Inclusiveness

=== Singapore Economic Roundtable (SER) ===
The bi-annual meeting of a select group of senior private sector economists, academics, business leaders and policy makers is intended to generate a frank discussion of major macro-economic policy issues facing Singapore. Each SER assesses current monetary and fiscal policy in the light of changing economic circumstances and provides a forum for non-policy makers to air their recommendations. The insights from the SER are published as an IPS publication and in the media.

=== Young Singaporeans Conference (YSC) ===
The YSC is a biennial conference that gathers about 70 young Singaporeans between 25 and 35 years of age who have shown leadership or excellence in their respective fields of endeavour to discuss their views on issues of national interest.

== Publications ==
IPS publishes research reports and books based on its work. They include:

- Singapore Chronicles
- Singapore Perspectives books
- Singapore Economic Roundtable
- IPS-Nathan Lectures book series
- IPS Working Papers
- IPS Exchange Series

IPS also has a blog, IPS Commons, a platform to promote and showcase rational discussion of public policy ideas in Singapore.

=== Singapore Chronicles ===
IPS and Straits Times Press jointly launched the Singapore Chronicles series in 2015 to commemorate Singapore's 50th year of independence. The series comprises 50 volumes that seek to record, explain and offer insights into what makes Singapore, Singapore. Topics covered in Singapore Chronicles include Constitution, Demography, Sports and Food.

=== Singapore Perspectives books ===
A compilation of the panel discussions and proceedings of IPS's annual flagship conference, Singapore Perspectives.

=== Singapore Economic Roundtable ===
A summary of insights generated from the bi-annual Singapore Economic Roundtable.

=== IPS-Nathan Lectures book series ===
A compilation of edited IPS-Nathan Lectures and excerpts of the accompanying question-and-answer sessions.

=== IPS Working Papers ===
Preliminary reports of work-in-progress on a broad range of issues such as emigration, ageing, inclusive growth and social inclusion and retirement funding. This may be research carried out by IPS researchers, worked commissioned by the Institute or work submitted to the Institute for publication.

=== IPS Exchange Series ===
Research findings, deliberations and policy recommendations arising from IPS programmes. Recent reports have generated scenarios based on future demographics, offered policy ideas to boost the contributions of SMEs to economic growth and examined the rationality of the online space.

== IPS Corporate Associates Programme ==
The IPS Corporate Associates (CA) programme, first launched in 1992, seeks to forge a bond between the business community and IPS, and to build a strong network of business leaders who can provide insights towards policymaking from a wide range of viewpoints.

Members of the CA programme benefit from, among other things, access to IPS research and monthly meetings with key thinkers and policy makers from both Singapore and abroad. The aim is to provide opportunities for CA members to keep abreast of, and participate in, discussions of major global developments and critical local issues that may affect their business environment.

Members of the CA programme include some of Singapore's most significant companies, representing business interests across major industries.

== Past leadership ==
- Founding patron: Goh Chok Tong
- Academic Panel Convenor: Tommy Koh (2010–Present)

=== Chairs ===
- Yong Pung How (1988–1989)
- Hsuan Owyang (1989–2004)
- Tommy Koh (2004–2010)

=== Directors ===
- Chan Heng Chee – Founding director (1987–1988)
- Jon Quah – acting director (1988–1990)
- Tommy Koh (1990–1997)
- Lee Tsao Yuan (1997–2000)
- Tommy Koh (2000–2004)
- Arun Mahizhnan – acting Director (2004–2008)
- Ong Keng Yong (2008–2011)
- Janadas Devan (since 2011)

== Notable people ==
- Tan Tarn How – Singapore playwright, research fellow

== See also ==
- List of think tanks in Singapore
