= P. S. Raman (diplomat) =

Singaporean diplomat (1920–1976)

- பாபநாசம் செட்லூர் ராமன்
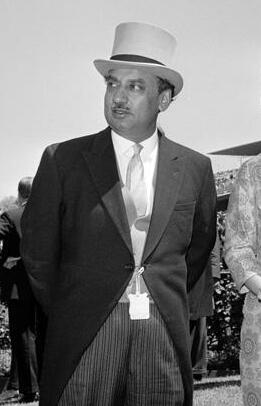
- Raman in 1970

Ambassador of Singapore to Indonesia
- In office June 1968 – November 1969
- Preceded by: Position established
- Succeeded by: Lee Khoon Choy

High Commissioner of Singapore to Australia
- In office December 1969 – May 1971
- Preceded by: Stanley Toft Stewart
- Succeeded by: A. P. Rajah

Ambassador of Singapore to the Soviet Union (Russia)
- In office June 1971 – 1976
- Preceded by: Position established
- Succeeded by: Joseph Francis Conceicao

Personal details
- Born: 1919 or 1920 Papanasam, Madras, British Raj (present-day Chennai, India)
- Died: 15 December 1976 (aged 56) Moscow, Soviet Union (present-day Moscow, Russia)
- Spouse: Lim Eng Neo
- Children: 3; including Bilahari

Papanasam Setlur Raman (Tamil: பாபநாசம் செட்லூர் ராமன்; 1919 or 1920 – 15 December 1976), commonly known as P. S. Raman, was an Indian-born Singaporean diplomat who served as the ambassador to Indonesia from 1968 to 1969, the high commissioner to Australia from 1969 to 1971, and the ambassador to the Soviet Union from 1971 to 1976.

A former educator, Raman also worked in broadcasting, and he served as the acting director of broadcasting from 1965 to 1968 at Radio Singapore. He was best known for advising then-prime minister Lee Kuan Yew not to edit out the clip of him crying after announcing the separation of Singapore from Malaysia.

== Early life and career ==
Raman was born in the British Raj in either 1919 or 1920 in Papanasam, Madras (present-day Chennai). He moved to Singapore in 1947, following the partition of India. He had originally planned to move from Singapore to Indonesia, but was unable to due to financial constraints. While living in India, Raman studied philosophy at Madras Christian College and worked as a Royal Air Force radar operator in Burma (present-day Myanmar) for the British during World War II. In Singapore, he worked as a teacher at Saint Andrew's School and a tutor. In 1963, he became a member of the Council of Adult Education, and later served as its chairman.

In the 1950s, Raman became interested in broadcasting. He worked in Tamil and later English at Radio Singapore's Central Production Unit, receiving further training in broadcasting in Madras, India. In 1958, he was appointed as Indian programme supervisor in the broadcasting department. He later served as the acting director of broadcasting from 1965 to 1968. During his tenure, Raman advised then-prime minister Lee Kuan Yew to not edit out a clip of him crying during his announcement of the separation of Singapore from Malaysia. Lee stated in his memoir that "[Raman] strongly advised against it. The press, he said, was bound to report it, and if he edited it out, their descriptions of the scene would make it appear worse."

== Diplomat career ==
=== Ambassador of Singapore to Indonesia (1968–1969) and High Commissioner of Singapore to Australia (1969–1971) ===
In 1968, Raman served as the first ambassador of Singapore to Indonesia, amidst tensions between Singapore and Indonesia since the 1965 MacDonald House bombing. After the hanging of the perpetrators Harun Thohir and Usman Haji Muhammad Ali, Raman and his staff were forced to work from Hotel Indonesia following death threats from Indonesians and the sacking of the Singapore embassy in Indonesia.

In 1969, Raman suffered a heart attack and received treatment at a hospital in Jakarta before being flown back to Singapore. In December 1969, he was appointed as high commissioner of Singapore to Australia.

=== Ambassador of Singapore to the Soviet Union (1971–1976) ===
In June 1971, Raman was appointed the first ambassador of Singapore to the Soviet Union (present-day Russia). Whilst serving as ambassador to the Soviet Union, he was also appointed as ambassador of Singapore to Finland, Poland, Bulgaria, and Hungary.

== Death ==
On 15 December 1976, Raman collapsed in a subway station in Moscow and died of a heart attack. He was flown back to Singapore and had a service held at St. Paul's Church before being cremated at Mount Vernon Columbarium. Then-foreign minister S. Rajaratnam stated "[Raman] was one of our better ambassadors, a good man, hardworking and conscientious." He was survived by his wife Lim Eng Neo, a Peranakan Chinese, and his 3 children. One of his children, Bilahari Kausikan, became a diplomat like him.
