= Robert W. Hamilton Book Award =

The Professor Robert W. Hamilton Book Author Award is presented annually to the best book-length publication by a staff or faculty member of the University of Texas at Austin. It is chosen by a committee of various disciplines, who in turn were chosen by the Vice President for Research at the University of Texas at Austin.

All nominated books are honored at a ceremony, in addition to the prizewinners. $10,000 is awarded to the first prize winner, with four additional $3,000 prizes.

== Past winners ==
- 2022: Peniel E. Joseph, Department of History, The Sword and the Shield: The Revolutionary Lives of Malcolm X and Martin Luther King Jr
- 2020: Elizabeth McCracken, Department of English, Bowlaway: A Novel
- 2019: Geraldine Heng, Department of English, The Invention of Race in the European Middle Ages
- 2018: Daina Ramey Berry, Department of History and African and African Diaspora Studies, The Price for Their Pound of Flesh: The Value of the Enslaved, from Womb to Grave, in the Building of a Nation
- 2017: Jordan Steiker, School of Law, Courting Death: The Supreme Court and Capital Punishment
- 2016: Charles Ramirez Berg, Department of Radio-Television-Film, The Classical Mexican Cinema: The Poetics of the Exceptional Golden Age Films
- 2015: Stephennie F. Mulder, Department of Art and Art History, The Shrines of the ‘Alids in Medieval Syria: Sunnis, Shi’is, and the Architecture of Coexistence
- 2014: Denise A. Spellberg, Department of History, Thomas Jefferson’s Qur’an: Islam and the Founders
- 2013: Julia E. Guernsey, Department of Art and Art History, Sculpture and Social Dynamics in Preclassic Mesoamerica
- 2012: James W. Pennebaker, Department of Psychology, The Secret Life of Pronouns: What Our Words Say About Us
- 2011: L. Michael White, Department of Classics, Scripting Jesus: The Gospels in Rewrite
- 2010: Shirley E. Thompson, Department of American Studies, Exiles at Home: The Struggle to Become American in Creole New Orleans
- 2009: Thomas O. McGarity and Wendy E. Wagner, School of Law, Bending Science: How Special Interests Corrupt Public Health Research
- 2008: Denise Schmandt-Besserat, Departments of Art and Art History and Middle Eastern Studies, When Writing Met Art: From Symbol to Story
- 2007: Evan Carton, Department of English, College of Liberal Arts, Patriotic Treason: John Brown and the Soul of America
- 2006: L. Michael White, Department of Classics, College of Liberal Arts, From Jesus to Christianity: How Four Generations of Visionaries & Storytellers Created the New Testament and Christian Faith
- 2005: Eric R. Pianka, Denton A. Cooley Centennial Professor in Zoology, Section of Integrative Biology, Lizards: Windows to the Evolution of Diversity
- 2004: Jeffrey Chipps Smith, Kay Forston Chair in European Art, Department of Art and Art History, Sensuous Worship: Jesuits and the Art of the Early Catholic Reformation in Germany
- 2003: Philip Bobbitt, A. W. Walker Centennial Chair, School of Law, The Shield of Achilles: War, Peace, and the Course of History
- 2002: Mounira M. Charrad, Professor of Sociology, States and Women's Rights: The Making of Postcolonial Tunisia, Algeria, and Morocco
- 2001: Lucas A. Powe Jr., Professor of Law, The Warren Court and American Politics
- 2000: A. P. Martinich, Professor of Philosophy, Hobbes: A Biography
- 1999: Linda Dalrymple Henderson, Professor of Art & Art History, Duchamp in Context: Science and Technology in the Large Glass and Related Works
- 1998: Neil F. Foley, Associate Professor of History, The White Scourge: Mexicans, Blacks, and Poor Whites in Texas Cotton Culture
- 1997: Robert H. Kane, Distinguished Teaching Professor of Philosophy, The Significance of Free Will
