= L. Michael White =

American biblical scholar

- Education: BA (1971), MA (1973), M.Div. (1975), MA (1977), MPhil (1978), Ph.D. (1982)
- Alma mater: Abilene Christian University; Yale Divinity School; Yale University
- Occupations: Professor of Classics and Religious Studies
- Employer(s): Institute for the Study of Antiquity and Christian Origins, University of Texas at Austin

L. Michael White is an American Biblical scholar. He is Ronald Nelson Smith Chair in Classics and Christian Origins, and director of the Institute for the Study of Antiquity and Christian Origins, at the University of Texas at Austin. He is the author or co-author of seven books, editor of four volumes and collected essays, and author of twenty-six articles. In 2011, White won the University of Texas' Robert W. Hamilton Book Award, a $10,000 prize, for his newest book Scripting Jesus (2010). White also won the same award in 2006 for his book From Jesus to Christianity. In addition, White is Project Director of the Ostia Synagogue Area Excavations, "Ostia Synagogue Masonry Analysis Project" or OSMAP, an archaeological field project to reevaluate the area around the ancient synagogue of Ostia Antica, the port city of ancient Rome. The Ostia Synagogue is the oldest synagogue in Europe, and is thought to be one of the oldest in the world.

White has served as consultant and co-writer, as well as being featured in, two PBS/Frontline documentaries: From Jesus to Christ: The First Christians and Apocalypse! Time, History, and Revelation.

== Published works ==
=== Books ===
- The Tabula of Cebes: Text and Translation, Chico, California: Scholars Press, 1983
- The HarperCollins Concise Atlas of the Bible, San Francisco: HarperCollins, 1991
- From Jesus to Christianity, San Francisco: HarperCollins, 2004.
- Scripting Jesus, San Francisco: HarperCollins, 2010.
