= Avadai Dhanam Lakshimi =

First Lady of Singapore from 1981 to 1985

Avadai Dhanam
- ஆவடை தனலட்சுமி
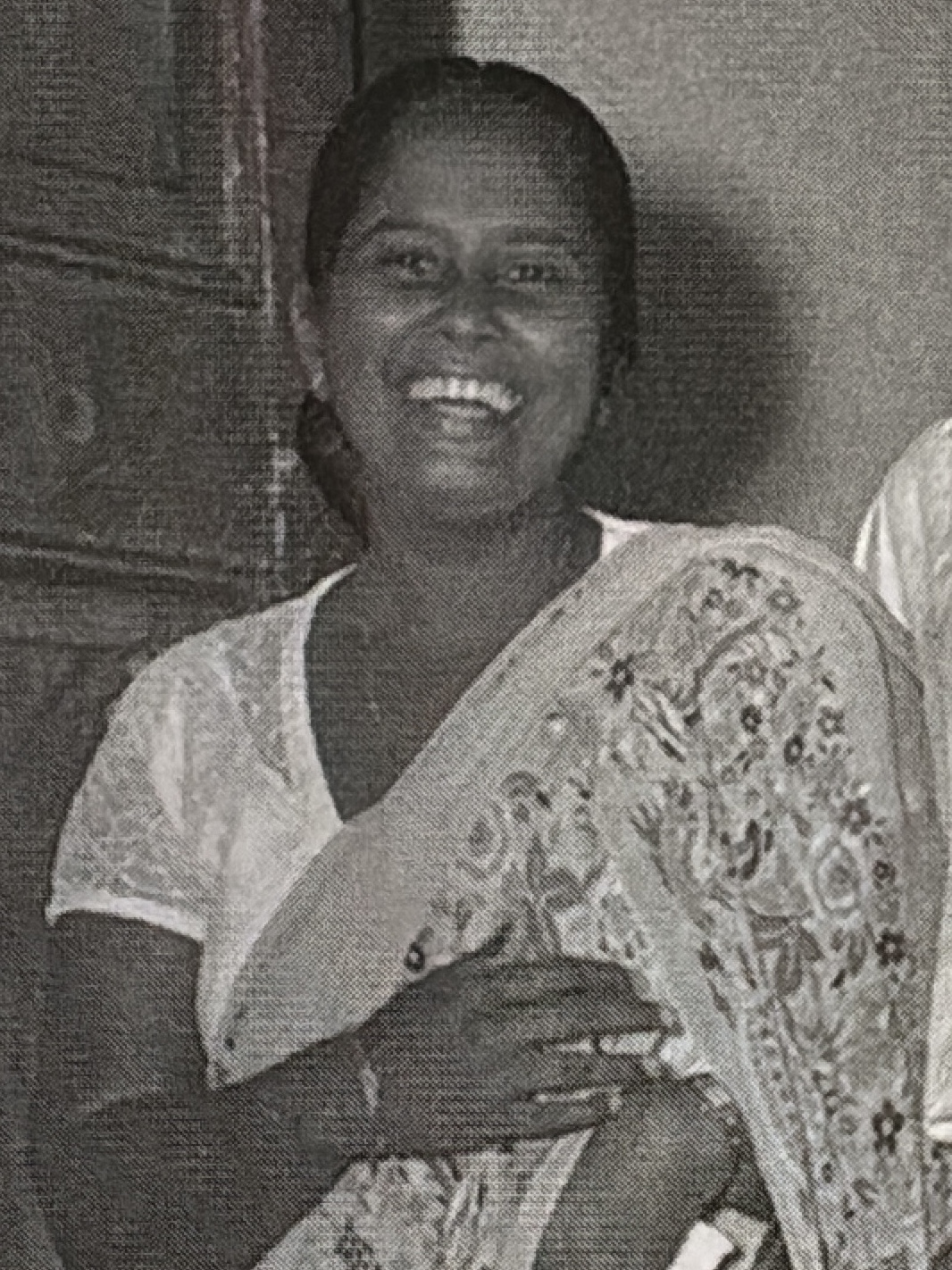
- Dhanam in April 1953

First Lady of Singapore
- In role 23 October 1981 – 28 March 1985
- President: Devan Nair
- Preceded by: Yeo Seh Geok
- Succeeded by: Koh Sok Hiong

Member of Parliament for Moulmein Constituency
- In office 21 September 1963 – 8 February 1968
- Preceded by: Lin You Eng
- Succeeded by: Lawrence Sia Khoon Seng

Personal details
- Born: Avadai Dhanam Lakshimi; 1925 Singapore, Straits Settlements
- Died: 18 April 2005 (aged 79–80) Hamilton, Ontario, Canada
- Party: People's Action Party
- Spouse: Devan Nair (m. 1953)
- Children: 4; including Janadas
- Parent(s): Avadai Thevar (father); Anjalaiammal (mother)

Avadai Dhanam Lakshimi (Note: Tamil: ஆவடை தனலட்சுமி, romanized: Āvaṭai Taṉalaṭcumi. Also known as Avadai Dhanalakshmi.) (1925 – 18 April 2005) was a Singaporean former politician who served as the Member of Parliament (MP) representing Moulmein SMC from 1963 to 1968 and the First Lady of Singapore when her husband, Devan Nair, served as president of Singapore from 1981 to 1985.

Dhanam became the first female MP of Indian ethnicity, when she was elected as the MP for Moulmein SMC in 1963. In her role as an MP she was known for her public health advocacy.

Serving in the role for 5 years, she retired in 1968, continuing to serve in the public service. She married Devan Nair in August 1953, who later became the President of Singapore.

== Early life ==
Born in 1925, Dhanam was a fourth-generation Singaporean Indian of Tamil descent with ancestry from Thanjavur, Tamil Nadu, India as the daughter of a contractor, both her parents died before she was 11. She was brought up by her mother's brother and her maternal grandmother along with her five siblings. Her grandmother later died during the Japanese Occupation.

Due to her family's poverty, she was only educated up to primary three.

During World War II, she took up sewing and farming to support her family.

== Marriage ==
Dhanam met her husband during childhood at Rangoon Road School. Her husband, then an anti-colonial protestor, was detained in prison from 1951 to 1953. Upon his release, they married in August 1953. During that period, she gave birth to two children, including journalist, Janadas Devan. During her husband's second political detention, from 1956 to 1959, she raised her children and managed her family by herself.

During her political career, she and her husband served as Members of Parliament (MP) in two different countries, with Devan Nair serving as the People Action Party's sole MP in the Malaysian Parliament for Bungsar Constituency until 1969.

== Career ==
=== Member of Parliament (1963–1968) ===
Dhanam was elected as the Member of Parliament (MP) for Moulmein SMC in 1963, representing the People's Action Party. She became an MP to stand for her husband as he had not gotten Singaporean citizenship yet. During her tenure, she was known for her advocacy in Singapore's Public Health Service, launching an X-Ray campaign in her constituency, in order to combat tuberculosis. She stepped down from Parliament in 1968.

=== Public life ===
After her retirement from the Public Office, Dhanam continued to keep a public profile, representing her husband at public events.

=== First Lady of Singapore ===
After her husband was elected as president in 1981, she became the 3rd First Lady of Singapore, continuing to advocate for health related causes, supporting organisations such as the Singapore Red Cross Society.

She served in this position until her husband's unexpected resignation in 1985.

== Later life ==
After Devan Nair's resignation, Dhanam and her husband migrated first to the United States in 1988 where they settled in Gaithersburg, Maryland. They later moved to Bloomington, Indiana. The couple later moved to Hamilton, Ontario, Canada, where they lived for the rest of their lives. She died on 18 April 2005, in Hamilton, from pneumonia, 8 months before her husband.
