= Vanu Gopala Menon =

Singaporean diplomat

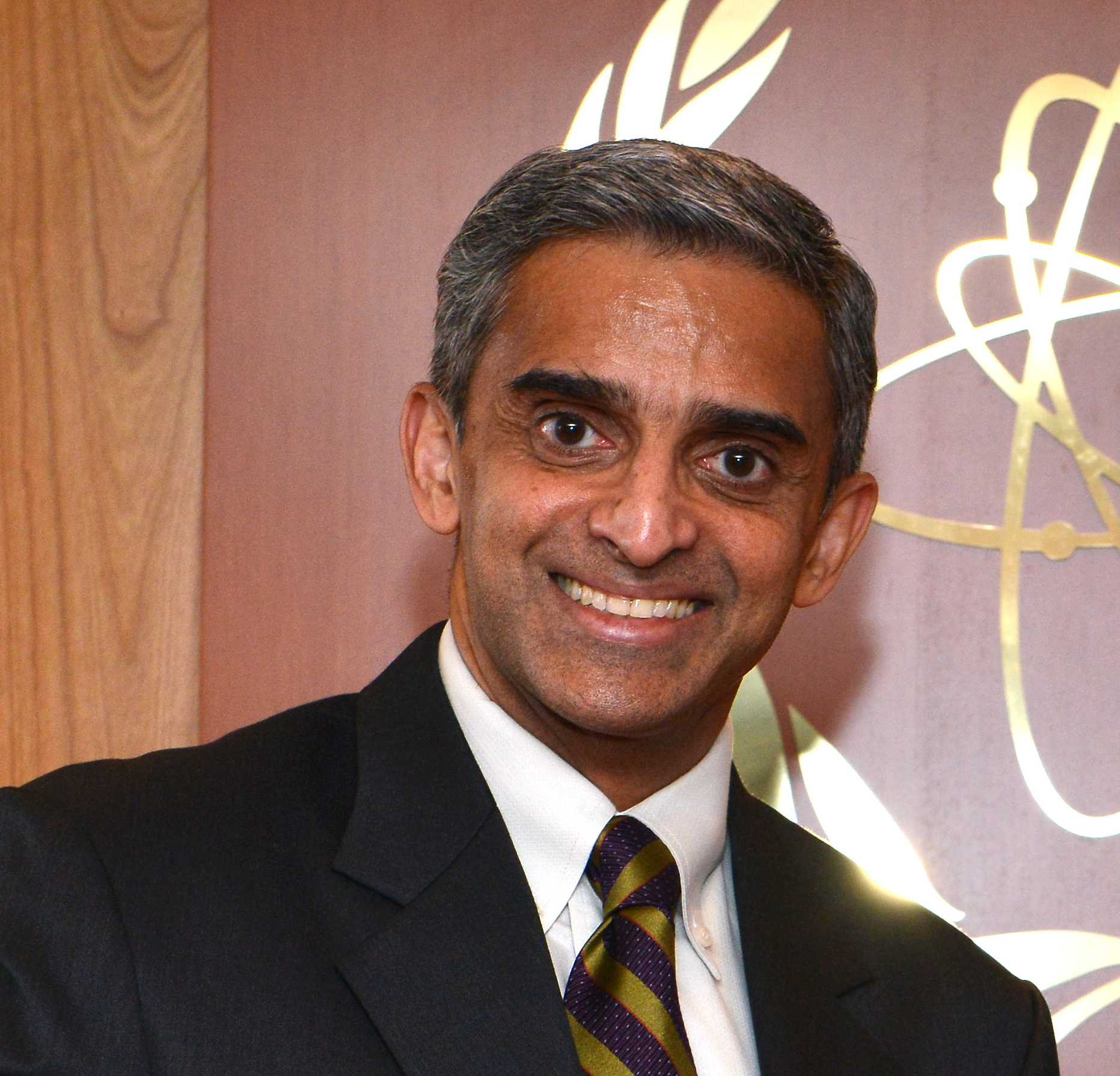
- Menon in 2013

High Commissioner of Singapore to Malaysia
- Incumbent
- Assumed office 25 November 2014
- Minister: K. Shanmugam; Vivian Balakrishnan
- Preceded by: Ong Keng Yong

Personal details
- Born: K. V. Vanu Gopala Menon s/o Ambalapatt Bhaskaran Menon; 8 September 1960 (age 66) Singapore

K. V. Vanu Gopala Menon s/o Ambalapatt Bhaskaran Menon (born 8 September 1960) is a Singaporean diplomat. Menon was the Permanent Representative of Singapore to the United Nations from 16 September 2004 to August 2011. He then became the Ambassador of Singapore to Malaysia from 25 November 2014.

== Education ==
Menon was educated at the National University of Singapore, receiving a Bachelor's degree in Business Administration in 1985. He was awarded a Master of Science in International Relations from the London School of Economics in 1994.

== Career ==
Menon joined the Ministry of Foreign Affairs in June 1985, becoming Deputy Secretary in 2011. He also served as First Secretary at Singapore's UN mission in New York from March 1988 to April 1991. Menon then served in the Singapore High Commission in Kuala Lumpur, Malaysia (November 1994 – November 1997). On his return to Singapore, he joined the Policy, Planning and Analysis Directorate of the Ministry, rising to become its Director (December 1998 – October 2001).

From December 2001 to August 2004, Menon was Permanent Representative to the United Nations and World Trade Organisation in Geneva and concurrently Ambassador to the Republic of Turkey.

From August 2004 to August 2011, he was Singapore's Permanent Representative to the United Nations in New York, and concurrently High Commissioner to Canada from November 2004 to May 2008.

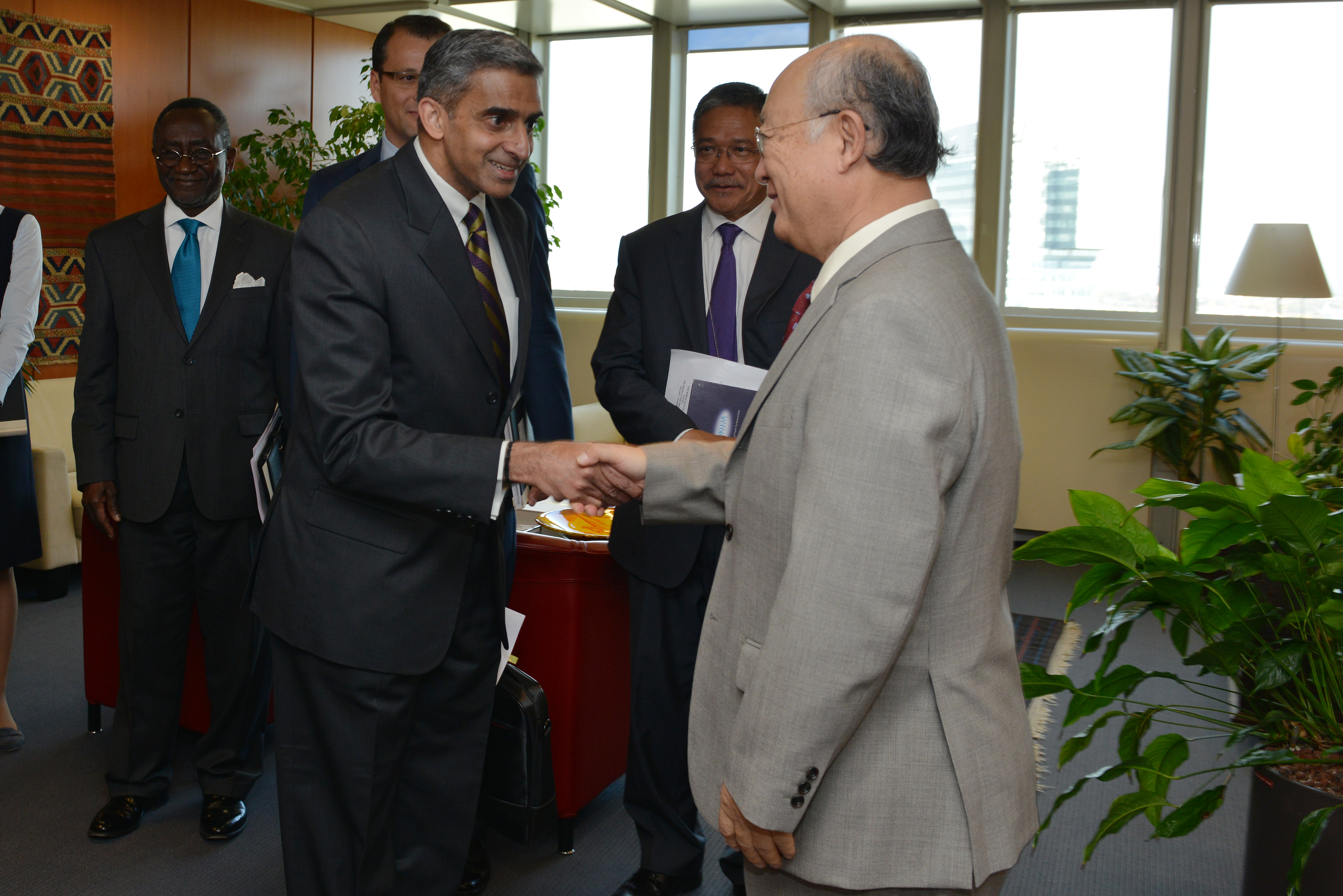
Menon meeting IAEA Director General Yukiya Amano in 2013

Menon was Non-Resident Ambassador to the African Union from April 2013 to October 2014 and concurrently to Ethiopia from August 2013 to October 2014.

== Personal life ==
Menon is married to Jayanthi Menon and they have a son and a daughter.

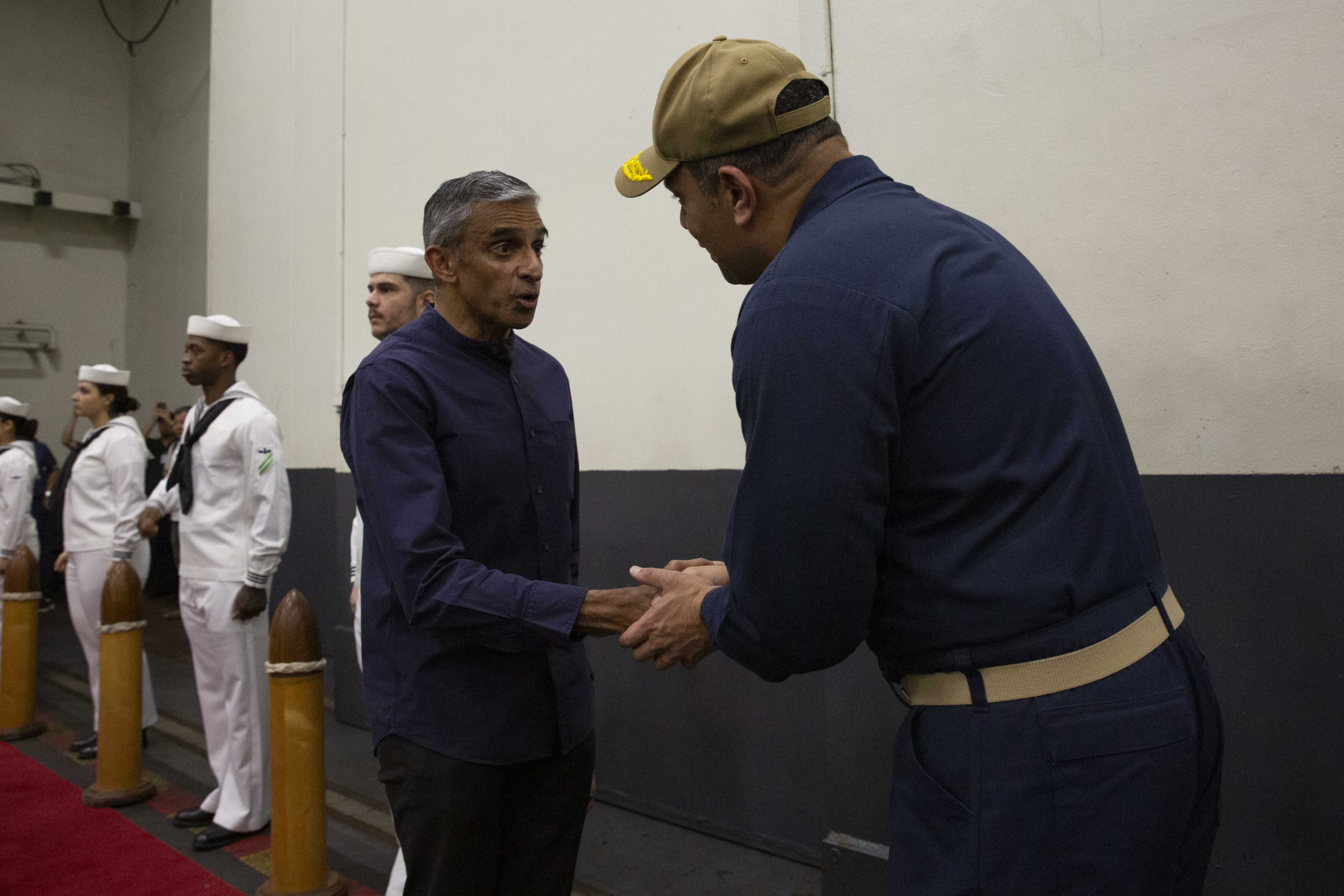
Menon visiting a United States Navy ship in 2024
