= Moulmein Single Member Constituency =

Historical constituency in Singapore

Coordinates: 1.324°N 103.849°E

Moulmein
- Former Single member constituency
- Region: Central Region, Singapore

Former constituency
- Created: 1959
- Abolished: 1991
- Seats: 1
- Member: 1
- Replaced by: Kampong Glam Group Representation Constituency

Moulmein Single Member Constituency was a constituency in Singapore. It used to exist from 1959 to 1988 as Moulmein Constituency and was renamed as Moulmein Single Member Constituency (SMC) as part of Singapore's political reforms. The SMC was merged into Kampong Glam Group Representation Constituency in 1991.

== Member of Parliament ==
| Year | Member of Parliament | Party |
Legislative Assembly of Singapore
| 1959 | Lin You Eng | PAP |
| 1963 | Avadai Dhanam Lakshimi | PAP |
Parliament of Singapore
| 1968 | Lawrence Sia | PAP |
| 1972 | Lawrence Sia | PAP |
| 1976 | Lawrence Sia | PAP |
| 1980 | Lawrence Sia | PAP |
| 1984 | Lawrence Sia | PAP |
| 1988 | Lawrence Sia | PAP |

== Electoral results ==
Note: The Elections Department does not include rejected votes when calculating the vote shares of candidates. Hence, all candidates' vote shares will total to 100% at any given election (may not appear so in multi-way contests due to rounding).

=== Elections in 1950s ===
General Election 1959: Moulmein
| Party | Candidate | Votes | % |
|---|---|---|---|
| PAP | Lin You Eng | 4,324 | 47.25 |
| SPA | Yap Jin Yau | 3,955 | 43.22 |
| LSP | Tan Peng Khoo | 872 | 9.53 |
| Majority | | 369 | 4.03 |
| Registered electors | | 10,095 | |
| Total valid votes | | 9,151 | 98.92 |
| Rejected ballots | | 100 | 1.08 |
| Turnout | | 9,251 | 91.64 |
| PAP win (new seat) | | | |

=== Elections in 1960s ===
General Election 1963: Moulmein
| Party | Candidate | Votes | % | ±% |
|---|---|---|---|---|
| PAP | Avadai Dhanam Lakshimi | 5,856 | 58.00 | ▲10.75 |
| BS | Tann Wee Tiong | 3,051 | 30.22 | N/A |
| SA | Koh Chiat Lim | 542 | 5.37 | N/A |
| UPP | Neo Hay Chan | 575 | 5.69 | N/A |
| Independent | Soo Tho Siu Hee | 73 | 0.72 | N/A |
| Majority | | 2,805 | 27.78 | ▲14.47 |
| Registered electors | | 10,670 | | ▲5.7 |
| Total valid votes | | 10,097 | 99.22 | ▲0.3 |
| Rejected ballots | | 79 | 0.78 | ▼0.3 |
| Turnout | | 10,176 | 95.37 | ▲3.73 |
| PAP hold | | Swing | ▲10.75 | |
