= Janadas Devan =

Singaporean journalist (born 1954)

- Born: 1954 (age 71–72); Colony of Singapore
- Occupations: Deputy Secretary (Prime Minister’s Office); Director of the Institute of Policy Studies
- Parent(s): Devan Nair (father); Avadai Dhanam Lakshimi (mother)

Janadas Devan (born 1954) is a former journalist and the current Deputy Secretary at the Prime Minister’s Office of Singapore, and Senior Advisor at the Ministry of Digital Development and Information. He is also a director at the public policy think-tank Institute of Policy Studies (IPS). Janadas was formerly a senior editor of The Straits Times, the flagship English-language daily newspaper of Singapore Press Holdings. He is the son of C.V. Devan Nair, the third President of Singapore. Janadas studied at the National University of Singapore and Cornell University in New York. He is married to literary scholar Geraldine Heng.

== Career ==
Before becoming a journalist, Janadas taught in universities in both Singapore and the United States. Subsequently, Janadas began working for The Straits Times and Radio Singapore International. His work at RSI was mainly focused on international politics, with a special emphasis on US politics. His weekly show was called Call from America, ranging from topics such as Barack Obama's presidential campaign to the War in Iraq. Janadas also wrote a column for The Straits Times. At one point, his contract with The Straits Times was terminated without any official explanation. He has stated that, "For reasons that remain unexplained, but which were clearly not journalistic, the column was halted." However, as of 2008, he is a regular contributor to the Straits Times.

== "377A debate and the rewriting of pluralism" ==
On 27 October 2007, Janadas wrote an article in The Straits Times entitled "377A debate and the rewriting of pluralism". In the article, Janadas rebutted the parliamentary speech of Singapore Nominated Member of Parliament Thio Li-ann. NMP Thio had argued that Singapore, being a conservative society, cannot tolerate homosexuals, also stating that a secular society needs to listen to the religious authorities. She had also said that the minorities in a plural society must listen to the views of the majority. Janadas wrote:

Consider how she tore to shreds so many of our cherished beliefs. The idiots that we are, we had believed "pluralism" meant, among other things, "autonomy and retention of identity for individual bodies", a "society in which the members of minority groups maintain their independent cultural traditions", "a system that recognises more than one ultimate principle or kind of being", as the Oxford English Dictionary puts it.

and

Oh, I cried when I read that. Imagine that: The moral conservative majority makes better vulgar jokes than the immoral liberal minority – and in Parliament too. If the immoral minority cannot beat the moral majority even in this department, we are really and truly kaput.

=== Impact ===
Following his article, dozens of blogs proceeded with a point-by-point rebuttal of NMP Thio's address. Ms Yvonne Lee Ching Ling, an assistant professor of law at NUS, wrote a letter to the Straits Times Forum as a reply to Janadas's article. Janadas has maintained that "Critical analyses surface with difficulty in Singapore, but the fact is they frequently do surface."

== "Can mum, mum and kids make a family?" ==
On 7 July 2007, Janadas Devan wrote an article in The Straits Times entitled "Can mum, mum and kids make a family?" where he advocated the formation of same-sex marriages in Singapore. He cited a personal anecdote of a female friend in the United States who had married another woman, with two healthy children and living an otherwise normal life. He wrote:

What will those who hold that homosexuality is against the laws of God say when it is definitively established that homosexuality has a genetic basis? That God deliberately made a mistake with the DNA of gays — and wishes us to persecute them for his mistake?

=== Impact ===
The article gained wide exposure in the Singaporean blogosphere and was widely reproduced online. It also generated a lot of responses to The Straits Times both for and against same-sex marriages.
