= Devan Nair =

President of Singapore from 1981 to 1985

Devan Nair BBM
- ദേവൻ നായർ
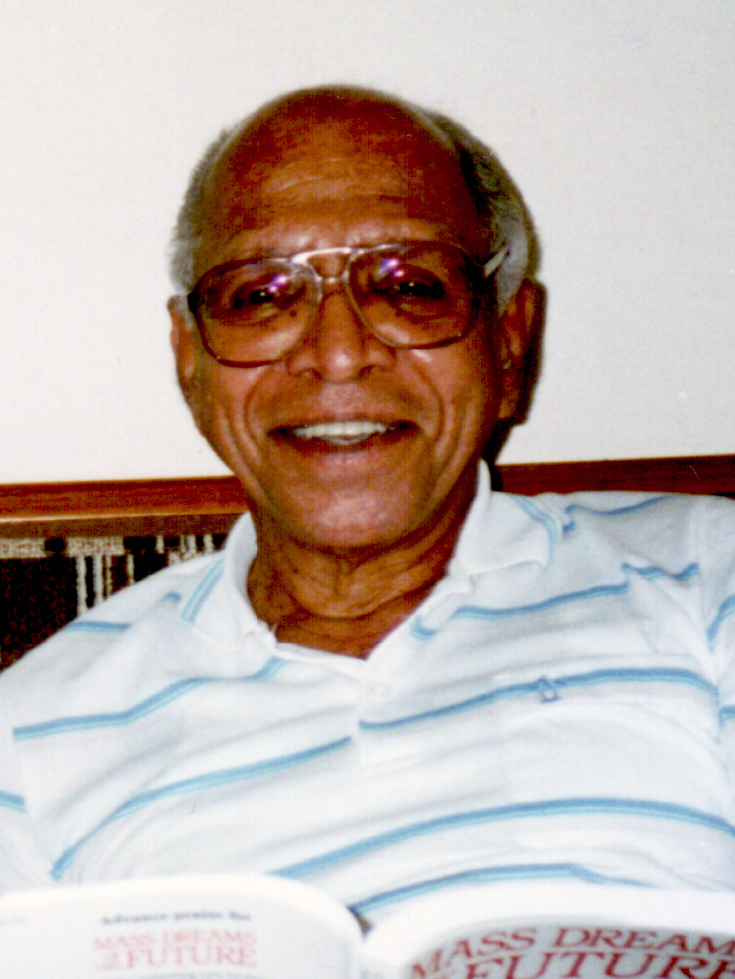
- Nair in 1994

3rd President of Singapore
- In office 23 October 1981 – 28 March 1985
- Prime Minister: Lee Kuan Yew
- Preceded by: Benjamin Sheares; Yeoh Ghim Seng (acting)
- Succeeded by: Wee Chong Jin (acting); Wee Kim Wee
Other offices
Secretary-General of the National Trades Union Congress
In office 1970–1979
Preceded by	Seah Mui Kok
Succeeded by	Lim Chee Onn
In office 1961–1965
Preceded by	Position established
Succeeded by	Steve Nayagan
Secretary-General of the Democratic Action Party
In office 11 October 1965 – 30 July 1967
Preceded by	Position established
Succeeded by	Goh Hock Guan
Secretary-General of the People's Action Party of Malaysia
In office 14 August 1965 – 9 September 1965
Preceded by	Lee Kuan Yew
Succeeded by	Position abolished

Member of the Singapore Parliament for Anson
- In office 10 February 1979 – 13 October 1981
- Preceded by: P. Govindaswamy
- Succeeded by: J. B. Jeyaretnam
- Majority: 1979: 6,827 (72.42%); 1980: 9,377 (68.20%)

Member of the Malaysian Parliament for Bangsar
- In office 18 May 1964 – 20 March 1969
- Preceded by: V. David
- Succeeded by: Goh Hock Guan

Personal details
- Born: Chengara Veetil Devan Nair; 5 August 1923 Jasin, Malacca, Straits Settlements (present-day Malacca, Malaysia)
- Died: 6 December 2005 (aged 82) Hamilton, Ontario, Canada
- Cause of death: Dementia
- Resting place: White Chapel Memorial Park, Hamilton, Ontario
- Party: Independent (1981–2005)
- Other political affiliations: People's Action Party (1954–1965, 1979–1981); Democratic Action Party (1965–1967); Malayan Communist Party (until 1950)
- Spouse: Avadai Dhanam Lakshimi (m. 1953; died 2005)
- Children: 4; including Janadas
- Education: Victoria School
- Occupation: Politician; union leader

Chengara Veetil Devan Nair (Note: /ˈdɛvən ˌnaɪər/; Malayalam: ചെങ്ങര വീട്ടിൽ ദേവൻ നായർ, romanized: Cengaṟa Vīṭṭil Dēvan Nāyar), BBM, (5 August 1923 – 6 December 2005) was a Singaporean union leader and politician who served as the third president of Singapore from 1981 until his resignation in 1985. A former member of the People's Action Party (PAP), he served as Member of Parliament (MP) for Anson Single Member Constituency from 1979 to 1981 .

Politically active in both Malaysia and Singapore, Nair was a communist in his youth, having been affiliated with the Malayan Communist Party (MCP). He held strong anti-colonial views and advocated for Singapore's self-determination at a time when it was still a British colony, which led to his detention by the British authorities in 1951. In 1954, he joined the People's Action Party (PAP). He was detained once more following the Chinese middle school student riots in 1956 and remained in custody until the PAP's landslide victory in the 1959 general election, after which he was released. In 1961, he founded the National Trades Union Congress (NTUC) and served as its Secretary-General until 1965.

During his parliamentary career, Nair was the Member of Parliament (MP) for the Malaysian constituency of Bangsar between 1964 and 1969 and for the Singapore constituency of Anson between 1979 and 1981. Prior to his presidency, Nair was Secretary-General of the People's Action Party of Malaya prior to Singapore's expulsion from Malaysia and continued to serve after the expulsion under its new name Democratic Action Party (DAP) which he founded until 1967.

Nair would soon return to Singapore and echoed his leftist beliefs by becoming involved in the labour movement, including serving as Secretary-General of the NTUC once more between 1970 and 1979, before taking up the presidency in 1981. He was succeeded by Wee Kim Wee on 2 September 1985. After his presidency in 1985, Nair retired from politics and briefly moved to the United States before moving again to live out his final years in Hamilton, Canada, when he died there at the age of 82 of dementia in 2005.

== Early life and education ==
Born on 5 August 1923 in Malacca during British colonial rule. Of Malayali ancestry, Nair was the son of a rubber plantation clerk, I. V. Karunakaran Nair of the Illathu Veettil family, who was originally from Thalassery, Kerala, British India.

Nair and his family emigrated to Singapore when he was ten years old and he received his primary education at Rangoon Road Primary School before enrolling into Victoria School for his secondary education where he passed his Senior Cambridge examination in 1940.

After the Second World War, Nair became a teacher at St Joseph's Institution and later, at St Andrew's School. In 1949, he became General-Secretary of the Singapore Teachers' Union. His disdain for colonial rule was apparent in those days, as he changed the lyrics of "Rule, Britannia!" to anti-British ones in a school choir performance before a British guest-of-honour.

== Career ==
=== Anti-imperialism beliefs ===
Nair was initially a member of the Communist Anti-British League before joining Lee Kuan Yew's People's Action Party (PAP) in 1954. Nair had been detained in 1951 by the British for anti-colonial activities. In 1955, Nair contested the 1955 Singaporean general election but lost – becoming the only PAP candidate who did not get elected.

In 1956, he was detained again under the Preservation of Public Security Ordinance Act alongside trade unionists such as Lim Chin Siong, Fong Swee Suan, Sandrasegaran Woodhull and James Puthucheary as suspected pro-communist subversives after the Chinese middle schools riots. They were released in 1959 when the PAP won the 1959 Singaporean general election in a landslide victory. He was subsequently appointed political secretary to the Minister for Education. He returned to teaching after a year. In 1960, he became Chairman of the Prisons Inquiry Commission and launched the Adult Education Board.

=== Involvement in PAP, DAP, and NTUC ===
Nair was the only PAP member who won a seat in the 1964 Malaysian general election, winning Bangsar, near Kuala Lumpur. This contrasted with his 1955 election defeat. He stayed in Malaysia after the separation, forming the Democratic Action Party (DAP), but returned to Singapore in 1969 to eventually lead the National Trades Union Congress (NTUC) once more, the labour union movement which he helped to established in 1961. Nair and P. P. Narayanan were advocates for the concerns of developing countries and voiced their concerns at the ICFTU as they saw economic and social policy documents that were biased towards industrialized nations. They wanted greater attention paid to extreme poverty, unemployment and underdevelopment of their countries. These proposals were accepted and later reflected in the work of ICFTU's Economic and Social Committee.

=== President of Singapore ===
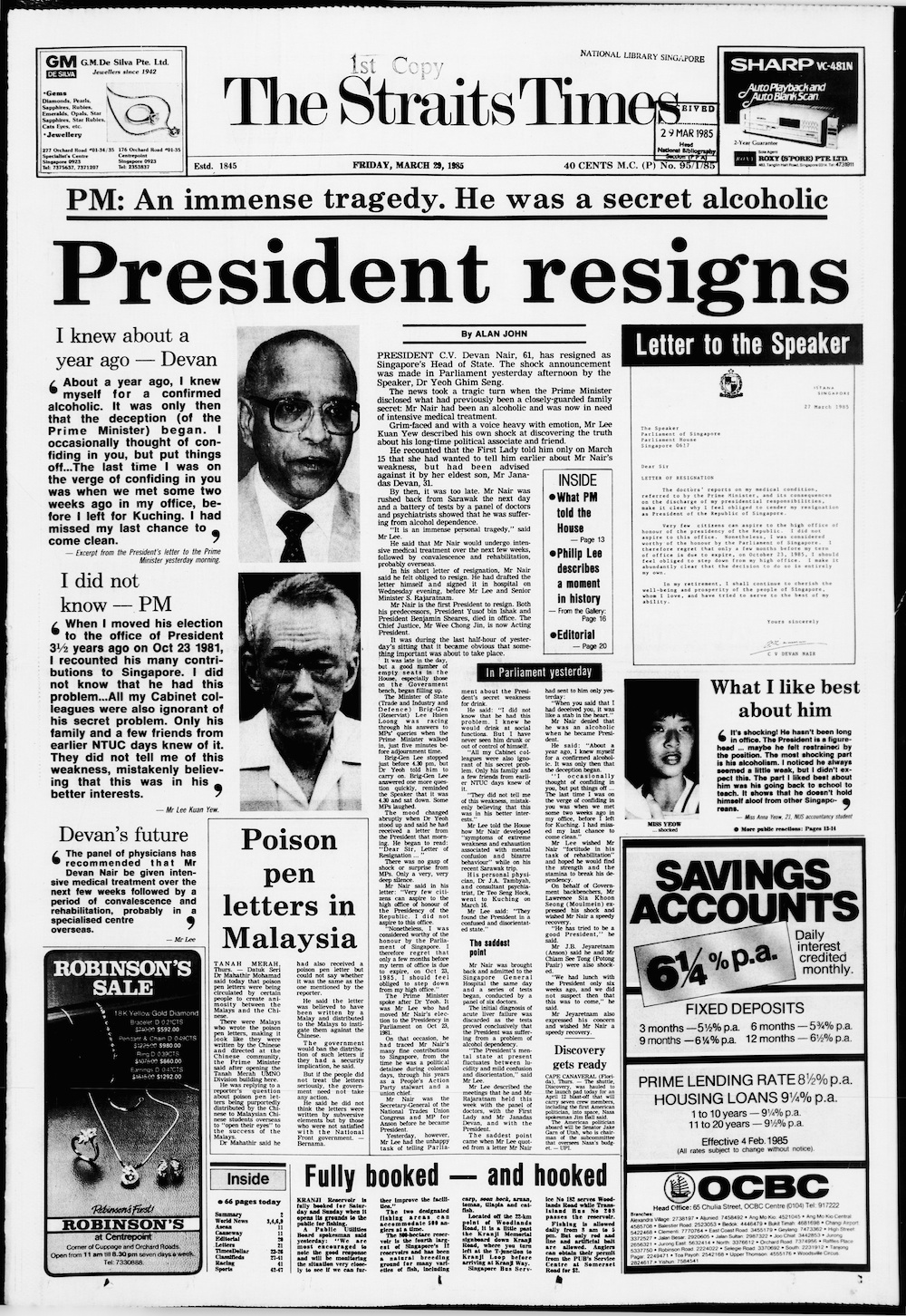
The Straits Times on 29 March, reporting on Nair's sudden resignation the previous day.

Nair entered the Parliament of Singapore in 1979 by winning the Anson seat in a by-election and successfully retained it in the 1980 general election. In 1981, he resigned from his parliamentary seat to accept the office of President, which at the time was largely ceremonial, serving as the country's head of state.

The vacancy in Anson triggered the 1981 Anson by-election, which was notably won by opposition leader J. B. Jeyaretnam of the Workers' Party (WP). This marked the first occasion since 1963 that a parliamentary seat had been won by a party candidate not representing the PAP.

==== Resignation ====
On 28 March 1985, Nair suddenly resigned under unclear circumstances. According to Lee's memoirs, on 15 March 1985 he was informed that Nair, during a trip to Kuching, Sarawak, Malaysia, had behaved inappropriately with women and molested them. Nair later collapsed and lost control of himself before being flown back to Singapore. Upon learning of these events, Lee met with First Lady Avadai Dhanam Lakshimi, who told him that Nair had been consuming a bottle of whisky every night over the previous months. In the weeks leading up to the Sarawak trip, Nair had disguised himself with a wig and left The Istana one night without security to meet a German woman. He was later discovered at Changi Cottage in the presence of liquor bottles and glasses marked with lipstick. The first lady recounted that there had been a quarrel between her and her husband before he assaulted and beat her while intoxicated.

After being hospitalised and treated by doctors, Nair was diagnosed with alcoholism on 23 March, with reports noting "many years of alcohol consumption". The Cabinet ultimately decided that Nair must resign, or face possible impeachment by Parliament if he refused. Lee and S. Rajaratnam visited Nair at Singapore General Hospital (SGH) on 27 March, after which he agreed to resign the following day. Nair then went to the Caron Foundation in Pennsylvania, United States for treatment. He insisted on receiving a pension, and the Cabinet agreed on the condition that government doctors would occasionally monitor his progress. After Parliament approved the provision, Nair later, for reasons unknown, declined it and denied having agreed to the condition.

Deputy Prime Minister Goh Chok Tong stated in Parliament that Nair had stepped down to seek treatment for his alcoholism, a claim that Nair would deny publicly. According to Nair's counterclaim, he was forced to resign due to political disagreements with Goh, who allegedly threatened him during a game of chess to remove him as president. Nair also alleged he was drugged to appear disoriented and that rumours about his personal life were spread to tarnish his reputation. However, Nair's allegations were never substantiated. In 1999, an article in the Canadian newspaper The Globe and Mail discussing the case prompted a libel suit by Goh. Some sources claimed the suit was dismissed following Nair's counterclaim.

In a letter to The New York Times, it was reported that Goh agreed to discontinue the libel suit only after two of Nair's sons issued a statement, published in The Globe and Mail on 1 July 2004, asserting that Nair was no longer mentally competent to testify in court. The statement concluded that "having reviewed the records, and on the basis of the family's knowledge of the circumstances leading to Mr. Nair's resignation as President of Singapore in March 1985, we can declare that there is no basis for this allegation (of Mr. Nair being drugged)."

Lee later added that it was only after Nair's resignation that he learned from Ho See Beng, a PAP MP and former NTUC colleague of Nair, that Nair had already struggled with a drinking problem before becoming president. Ho told Lee that Nair's alcoholism seemed to be in control at the time, and therefore he did not feel it was necessary to inform Lee when Nair was nominated for the presidency.

== Personal life and death ==
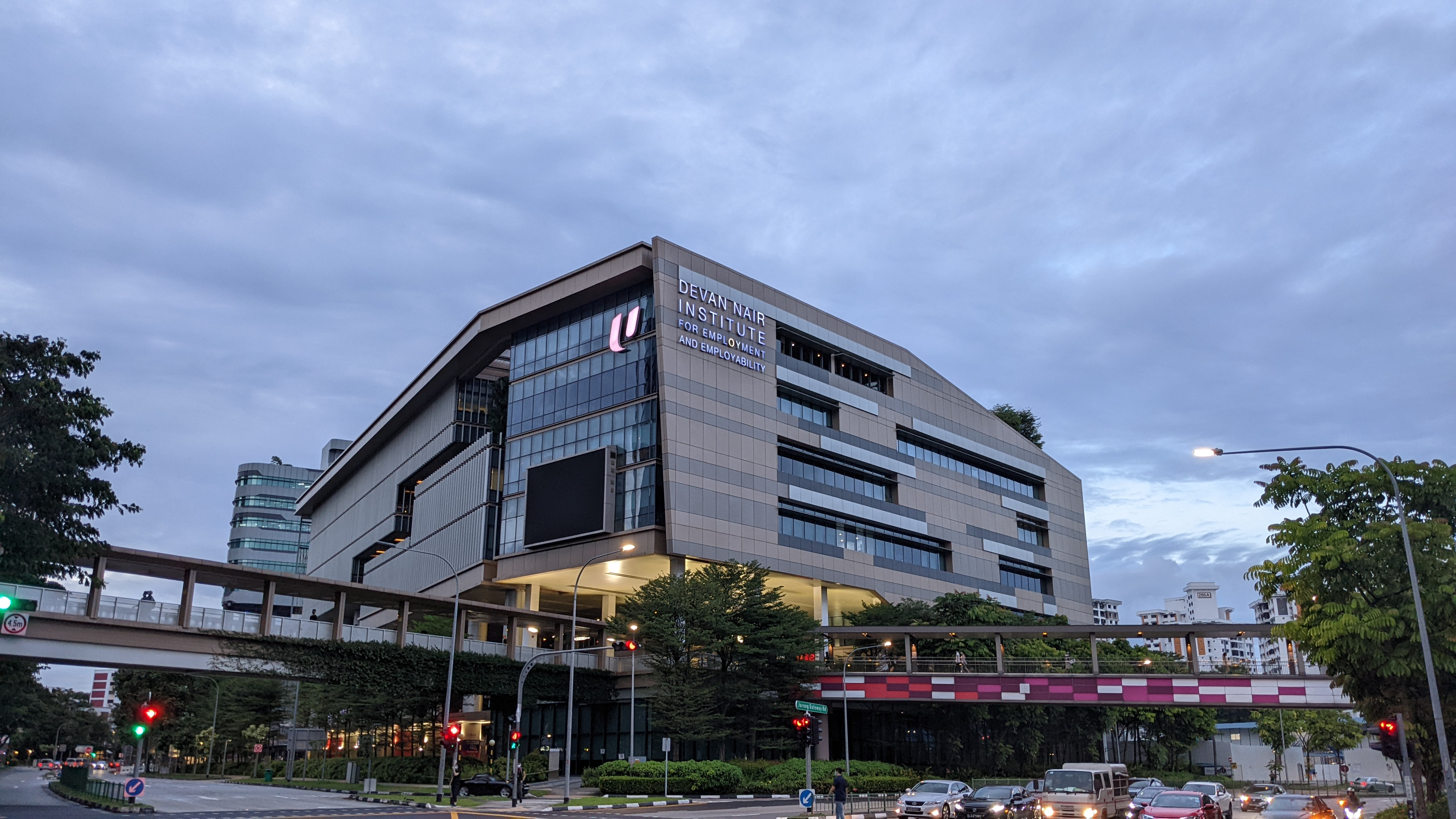
Devan Nair Institute for Employment and Employability

After his resignation as president, Nair and his wife migrated first to the United States in 1988 where they settled in Gaithersburg, Maryland. They later moved to Bloomington, Indiana. They finally moved to Hamilton, Ontario, Canada, where they lived for the rest of their lives. His wife, Avadai Dhanam Lakshimi, died on 18 April 2005 in Hamilton, whilst Nair, who had developed severe dementia, died on 6 December of the same year in the same city. After his death, he was cremated and his ashes were buried at White Chapel Memorial Park, together with his wife.

Nair was survived by his daughter, three sons, and five grandchildren. His eldest son, Janadas Devan, was a senior editor with The Straits Times and is currently Chief of Government Communications at the Ministry of Communications and Information (MCI) and also a director at the public policy think-tank Institute of Policy Studies (IPS). Janadas Devan is married to literary scholar Geraldine Heng. His second son, Janamitra Devan, was the former vice-president of the International Finance Corporation, and the World Bank. His third son, Janaprakash Devan died in 2009. His only daughter, Vijaya Kumari Devan continues to reside in Hamilton, Ontario. Nair was a good friend of Dutch economist Albert Winsemius, and composed a poem titled "The Yangtze's Voyage Through History" for him.

=== Devan Nair Institute ===
Nair's legacy remains highly respected in Singapore, especially in regards to his association with the labour movement. The Devan Nair Institute for Employment and Employability located in Jurong East was opened on 1 May 2014 by Prime Minister Lee Hsien Loong to recognise his contributions to the labour movement when he was Secretary-General of National Trades Union Congress. The goal of the institution is to establish a network for workers and employers seeking employment and employability solutions in Singapore.

== Awards and honours ==
- Singapore
  - Bintang Bakti Masyarakat (BBM, Public Service Star)

== Notes ==
=== Bibliography ===
- Chew, Melanie (29 July 2015). Leaders of Singapore. World Scientific. doi:10.1142/9768. ISBN 9789814719452.

Political offices
Preceded by Benjamin Henry Sheares	President of Singapore; 1981–1985	Succeeded by Wee Kim Wee
Parliament of Singapore
Preceded by Perumal Govindaswamy	Member of Parliament for Anson; 1979–1981	Succeeded by J.B. Jeyaretnam
Government offices
Preceded by Seah Mui Kok	Secretary-General, National Trades Union Congress; 1970–1979	Succeeded by Lim Chee Onn
Preceded by New position	Secretary-General, National Trades Union Congress; 1961–1965	Succeeded by ST Nagayan
Trade union offices
Preceded by P. P. Narayanan	President of the ICFTU Asian Regional Organisation; 1976–1982	Succeeded by Tadanobu Usami
