= Radio Singapore International =

International broadcasting service of Singapore

Radio Singapore International (RSI)
- Type: Radio network
- Country: Singapore
- First air date: 1 February 1994
- Availability: International
- Founded: 1 January 1994
- Licence area: Caldecott Broadcasting Centre
- Broadcast area: International
- Area: Singapore
- Owner: Mediacorp Radio
- Key people: Ho Kwon Ping
- Launch date: 1 February 1994
- Dissolved: 31 July 2008
- Group: Mediacorp
- Language: English; Mandarin Chinese; Malay; Indonesian

Radio Singapore International (abbreviated RSI; Chinese: 新加坡国际广播电台 Pinyin: Xīnjiāpō Guójì Guǎngbō Diàntái; Malay: Radio Antarabangsa Singapura; Indonesian: Radio Internasional Singapura) was the official international broadcasting station of Singapore, existing from 1 February 1994 to 31 July 2008, owned by Mediacorp. It broadcast in English, Mandarin, Malay and Indonesian.

== Operation ==
The English service operated on shortwave between 1100hrs - 1400hrs UTC daily on 6080 kHz and 6150 kHz (49m Band) at closing time. A live audio stream was also available on its website. Its signal was simulcast an hour a day on 938LIVE. Its news and current affairs programming covered financial, economic, and political developments around the world, but primarily around Southeast Asia. Lifestyle programmes covered a variety of areas, from culture and travel to the Internet and technology. Music played on the station ranges from classic and oldies, to contemporary and easy listening.

Sakuntala Gupta was Senior Programme Director of RSI (English). Past producers/presenters of RSI's English service were: Bharati Jagdish, who now co-anchors a morning show on MediaCorp Radio 938 LIVE, Ariel Wee, Chan Kah Mei, Daphne Tan, Howie Lim, Belinda Sunshine, Augustine Anthuvan, Felix Tan, Melanie Yip, Loretta Foo, Michael Darren Tan, Jason Tan and Shereena Sajeed. Past contributors of RSI were: William Xavier, Janadas Devan, Chris Ho, and Mike Kellerman.

On 1 January 2005, RSI (English) also launched a microsite which features articles covering a range of issues related to travel, entertainment and controversial socio-political issues.

== History ==
The Singapore Broadcasting Corporation (which was being privatised) announced the launch of Radio Singapore International on 23 January 1994 for a 1 February launch date. Each language service aired on a different shortwave frequency (English on 9530 kHz, Mandarin on 9635 kHz and Malay on 9590 kHz), for three hours a day (all services 7-8am; English and Mandarin 7-9pm and Malay 8-10pm), catering Singaporeans and foreigners in Southeast Asia. The launch was matched with that of Singapore International Television in January to provide information to Singaporeans abroad. SBC employed twelve staff (five for the English service, four in Mandarin and three in Malay) producing news and lifestyle programmes. The service opened on 1 February, being opened by Dr. Ker Sin Tze (Minister of the State, Information and the Arts). In his opening speech, he announced that RSI would expand in the future to include Thai, Tagalog and Indonesian. The service never had plans to become truly global, as the infrastructure was deemed too costly to upgrade for such a setup. RSI also carried the National Day Parade since the station's inception.

When SBC was dissolved on 1 October 1994, the station was put under the hands of the Radio Corporation of Singapore. As of early 1995, the English service was the most popular of the three, receiving fan letters from India and Japan, as well as a growing number of listeners from the United States, Europe and Australia interested in its programmes. The Chinese service was the most popular in East Malaysia, Indonesia and China, and the Malay service, popular in Indonesia. At the time, the station was broadcasting from 7pm to 10pm SGT. Later, an internet stream was available carrying RSI's programmes, except for the 7-10pm slot. RCS insiders joked about RSI being Singapore's "best kept secret" because one cabinet minister was unaware of its existence. Later, it was announced that, with the launch of NewsRadio 93.8, the station would provide it with a one-hour simulcast. The RSI Hour started on 2 September 1998.

RSI celebrated its tenth anniversary in Batam on 4 March 2004 with a special business meeting with the Batam Pos newspaper. On 4 October 2005, it launched its first book, Islamic Thinkers, based on scripts for the radio programme of the same name that aired on both RSI and Warna.

On 3 June 2008, MediaCorp announced that RSI would end its transmission on 31 July 2008. MediaCorp noted that shortwave radio was no longer effective, causing its closure. All RSI staff were redeployed to other areas.
