= List of ambassadors of Singapore =

This is a list of ambassadors, high commissioners and permanent representatives of the Republic of Singapore to other countries and international organisations. Singapore has a total of 27 resident ambassadors/high commissioners (some of whom are concurrently accredited to other countries), 4 resident permanent representatives, and 39 non-resident ambassadors.

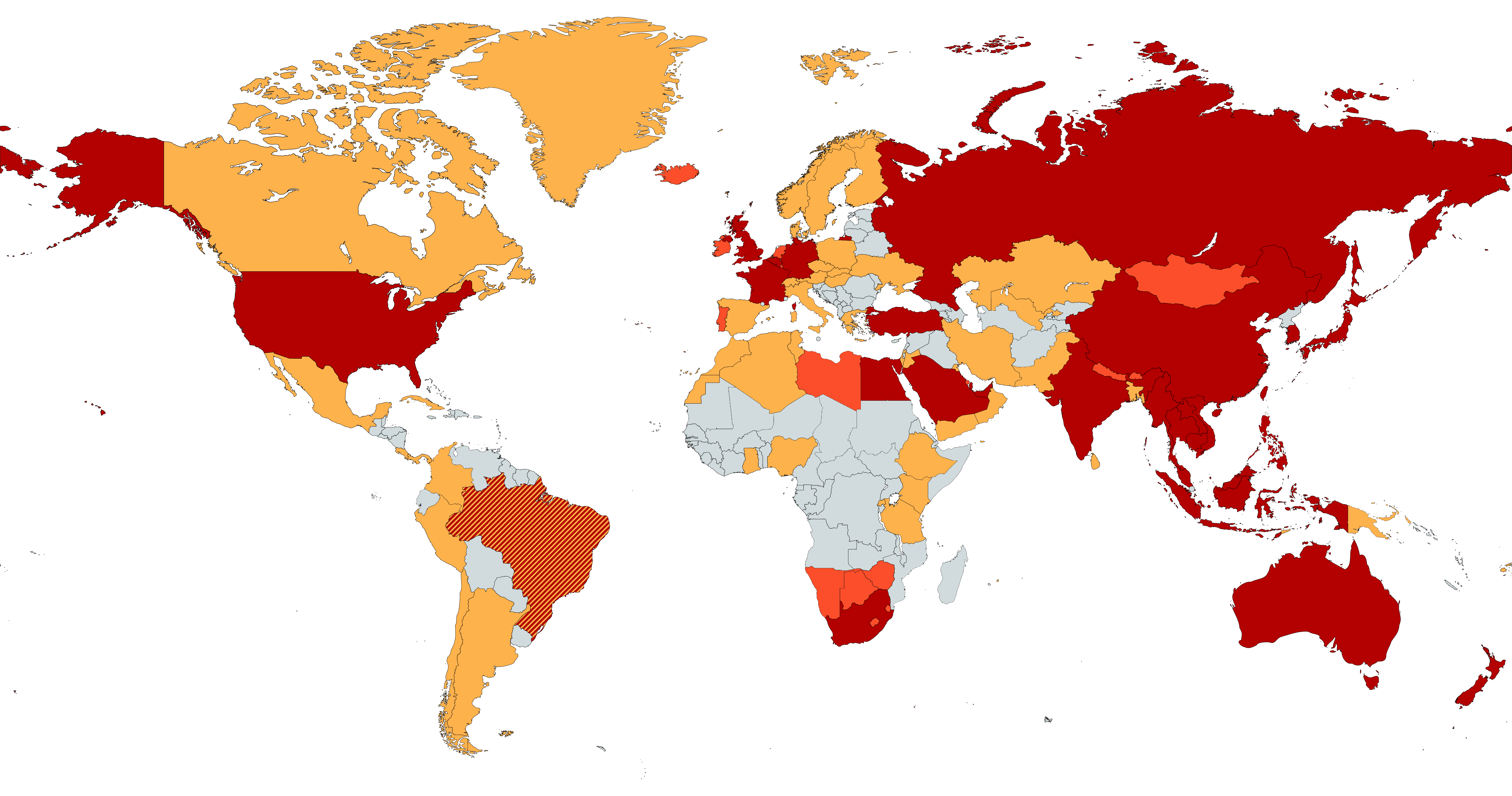
Countries in which Singapore has a resident Ambassador or High Commissioner Countries to which Singapore has accredited an Ambassador or High Commissioner resident in another country Countries to which Singapore has accredited an Ambassador or High Commissioner resident in Singapore

== List of ambassadors ==
Host country	Location of embassy	Current ambassador	Date of appointment (Note: The date of appointment refers to the date on which a Head of Mission receives their Letter of Credence from the President of the Republic of Singapore. This is different from the date the Head of Mission officially assumes post, which is when they present their credentials to the Head of State of their host country or the Secretary-General of their host organisation.)	Concurrent accreditation
Belgium	Brussels	Heng Aik Yeow	10 March 2026	EU; Luxembourg; Netherlands; Organisation for the Prohibition of Chemical Weapons
Cambodia	Phnom Penh	Steven Pang	27 January 2026	
Egypt	Cairo	Dominic Goh	29 August 2019	Libya
France	Paris	Umej Bhatia	5 January 2026	Portugal
Germany	Berlin	Lee Chong Hock	24 August 2023	
Indonesia	Jakarta	Kwok Fook Seng	28 June 2022	
Japan	Tokyo	Ong Eng Chuan	12 June 2023	
Laos	Vientiane	Ong Siew Gay	20 October 2025	
Myanmar	Yangon	Vanessa Chan	29 November 2017	
China	Beijing	Peter Tan	25 April 2023	
Philippines	Manila	Constance See	30 May 2023	
Qatar	Doha	Pong Kok Tian	18 February 2025	
Russia	Moscow	Mark Neo	25 July 2023	
Saudi Arabia	Riyadh	S. Premjith	29 August 2023	Bahrain
South Korea	Seoul	Eric Teo	25 July 2019	Mongolia
Thailand	Bangkok	Catherine Wong	31 October 2023	
Turkey	Ankara	Kok Li Peng	29 August 2023	
United Arab Emirates	Abu Dhabi	Kamal R. Vaswani	23 January 2020	
United States	Washington, D.C.	Lui Tuck Yew	30 May 2023	
Vietnam	Hanoi	Rajpal Singh	30 September 2025	

== List of high commissioners ==
A high commissioner heads a high commission, just as an ambassador heads an embassy. High commissioners are therefore also of ambassadorial rank. The term high commission is used to refer to the diplomatic mission of one former British colony - or the United Kingdom - in another (i.e. diplomatic missions within the Commonwealth of Nations).

Host country	Location of high commission	Current high commissioner	Date of appointment	Concurrent accreditation
Australia	Canberra	Anil Nayar	19 July 2022	
Brunei	Bandar Seri Begawan	Yip Wei Kiat	27 January 2026	
India	New Delhi	Simon Wong	30 June 2020	Bhutan; Nepal
Malaysia	Kuala Lumpur	Vanu Gopala Menon	29 October 2014	
New Zealand	Wellington	William Tan	29 August 2023	
South Africa	Pretoria	Zainal Arif Mantaha	31 August 2021	Botswana; Eswatini; Lesotho; Namibia; Zimbabwe
United Kingdom	London	Ng Teck Hean	29 August 2023	Iceland; Ireland

== List of permanent representatives ==
A permanent representative heads a diplomatic mission to an international organisation. They are also of ambassadorial rank.

Host organisation	Location of permanent mission	Current permanent representative	Date of appointment	Concurrent accreditation
Association of Southeast Asian Nations	Jakarta	Gerard Ho	27 June 2023	
United Nations	New York City	Burhan Gafoor	28 July 2016	
United Nations	Geneva	Jaya Ratnam	25 November 2025	International Labour Organization; International Telecommunication Union; World Health Organization etc.
United Nations	Vienna	Jaya Ratnam	25 November 2025	International Atomic Energy Agency; Preparatory Commission for the Comprehensive Nuclear-Test-Ban Treaty Organization; International Narcotics Control Board etc.
World Trade Organization	Geneva	Tan Hung Seng	31 January 2019	World Intellectual Property Organization

== List of non-resident ambassadors, high commissioners, and permanent representatives ==
In view of Singapore's small population and limited resources, it is not tenable for Singapore to have resident missions in all countries with which it has diplomatic relations. Instead, Singapore appoints non-resident ambassadors (NRAs) or non-resident high commissioners (NRHCs) to certain countries. NRAs/NRHCs are resident in Singapore, but make regular representational visits to their country of accreditation. They are typically non-diplomats, though some are former diplomats. When on representational visits or while performing other official duties, NRAs/NRHCs have the same powers and authority as resident heads of mission.

Country/Organisation of accreditation	Title	Current appointment holder	Date of appointment
African Union	Ambassador	A. Selverajah (Note: A. Selverajah is concurrently Non-Resident Ambassador to the African Union and Ethiopia.)	13 July 2021
Algeria	Ambassador	Mohammad Alami Musa	29 October 2013
Argentina	Ambassador	Leong Horn Kee	25 August 2020
Austria	Ambassador (Note: Singapore has a diplomatic mission in Vienna. However, it only serves as the Permanent Mission to the United Nations and other international organisations in Vienna. It is not bilaterally accredited to Austria.)	Chan Heng Wing	27 April 2017
Brazil	Ambassador (Note: Singapore has a resident embassy in Brasília. However, it is headed by a Chargé d'affaires who is of Minister-Counsellor rank.)	Chia Wei Wen	30 June 2026
CARICOM	Plenipotentiary Representative	Karen Tan	20 April 2018
Chile	Ambassador	Chong Siak Ching	30 July 2015
Colombia	Ambassador	Gerald Balendran Singham	30 June 2026
Costa Rica	Ambassador	Chaly Mah	14 February 2022
Cuba	Ambassador	Shashi Jayakumar	29 April 2025
Czech Republic	Ambassador	Tan Soo Khoon	21 February 2007
Denmark	Ambassador	Tan Poh Hong	11 January 2022
Ethiopia	Ambassador	A. Selverajah	13 July 2021
Fiji	High Commissioner	Mary Seet-Cheng (Note: Mary Seet-Cheng is concurrently Non-Resident High Commissioner to Fiji and Non-Resident Ambassador to the Pacific Islands Forum.)	25 February 2020
Finland	Ambassador	Cheong Koon Hean	15 February 2023
Greece	Ambassador	Simon Tay	23 January 2020
Ghana	High Commissioner	Hawazi Daipi	22 December 2016
Holy See	Ambassador	Janet Ang	29 September 2020
Hungary	Ambassador	Ng Shin Ein	2013
Iran	Ambassador	Ong Keng Yong	29 October 2008
Israel (Note: In March 2022, Singapore announced that it would establish a resident embassy in Tel Aviv. Once done, the Non-Resident Ambassador will likely be replaced by a resident Ambassador in Tel Aviv.)	Ambassador	Ian Mak	31 October 2023
Italy	Ambassador	Ow Chio Kiat	26 August 2015
Jordan	Ambassador	Shamsher Zaman	30 July 2015
Kazakhstan	Ambassador	Zulkifli Baharudin (Note: Zulkifli Baharudin is concurrently Non-Resident Ambassador to Kazakhstan and Uzbekistan.)	28 May 2014
Kenya	High Commissioner	Ernest Kan	29 April 2025
Kuwait	Ambassador	Abu Bakar Mohd Nor	18 February 2025
Maldives	High Commissioner	Sitoh Yih Pin	21 July 2026
Mauritius	Ambassador	Lim Ming Yan	11 January 2022
Mexico	Ambassador	Gerald Balendran Singham	25 October 2022
Morocco	Ambassador	Chua Kee Lock (Note: Chua Kee Lock is concurrently Non-Resident High Commissioner to Morocco and Panama.)	6 January 2026
Norway	Ambassador	Tan Wah Yeow	25 April 2019
Oman	Ambassador (Note: Singapore has a resident diplomatic mission in Muscat. However, it is a Consulate-General, headed by a Consul-General.)	Teng Theng Dar	26 March 2008
Pacific Islands Forum	Ambassador	Mary Seet-Cheng	25 February 2020
Pakistan	High Commissioner	Ishak Ismail	18 February 2025
Panama	Ambassador	Chua Kee Lock	6 January 2026
Peru	Ambassador	T. Jasudasen	13 July 2021
Poland	Ambassador	Loo Choon Yong	26 August 2015
Rwanda	High Commissioner	Jaspal Singh	9 February 2021
Slovakia	Ambassador	Chay Wai Chuen	25 June 2014
Spain	Ambassador	Jennie Chua	27 October 2020
Sri Lanka	High Commissioner	Patrick Daniel	21 July 2026
Sweden	Ambassador	Andrew Kwan	28 May 2019
Switzerland	Ambassador	Andrew Toh	19 May 2016
Tanzania	High Commissioner	Douglas Foo	5 March 2019
Timor-Leste	Ambassador	Robin Hu	25 October 2022
Tunisia	Ambassador	Anthony Ang	29 September 2016
Ukraine	Ambassador	Simon Tensing de Cruz	24 September 2008 (Note: From 2008 to 2012, Simong Tensing de Cruz served as Singapore's resident Ambassador in Moscow, with concurrent accreditation to Ukraine. Following the completion of his tenure in Moscow, he retained the position of Non-Resident Ambassador to Ukraine.)
UNESCO	Permanent Delegate (Note: In the Non-Resident Permanent Delegate's absence, the Deputy Chief of Mission in Paris serves as the Alternate Permanent Delegate.)	Rosa Huey Daniel	19 July 2022
Uzbekistan	Ambassador	Zulkifli Baharudin	28 May 2014
Yemen	Ambassador	Vacant (Note: Helmi Talib resigned in 2020. His successor has yet to be announced.)	
