= Cheong Koon Hean =

Singaporean urban planner and architect

- 蔡君炫

Non-Resident Ambassador of Singapore to Finland
- Incumbent
- Assumed office 10 January 2023
- Minister: Vivian Balakrishnan
- Preceded by: Jaya Mohideen

Personal details
- Born: 1957 (age 68–69)
- Education: University College London
- Awards: Pingat Pentadbiran Awam
- Practice: Urban Redevelopment Authority

Cheong-Chua Koon Hean (Note: Pinyin Cai Jūnxuàn) (born 1957) is a Singaporean urban planner and architect who has served as the Non-Resident Ambassador of Singapore to Finland since 2023.

== Biography ==
Cheong is a Colombo Plan scholar with a first class degree in architecture at Newcastle University in 1981. Cheong completed a master's degree in Urban Development Planning from the University College London, and did a six-week Advanced Management Programme at Harvard Business School. She received an honorary doctorate of architecture from the University of Newcastle in 2010.

Cheong started working as a public servant in 1984. Cheong was the CEO of the Urban Redevelopment Authority (URA) between 2004 and 2010 where she was in charge of various areas, such as conservation of historic buildings and real estate. The Straits Times wrote that her work as CEO of URA played "a key role in developing Singapore into a distinctive global city." She also was the first woman to head the URA. From 2010 to 2020, she had been the CEO of the Housing and Development Board in Singapore. Thereafter, she became Chair of the Lee Kuan Yew Centre for Innovative Cities as well as Professor of Practice in the Singapore University of Technology and Design. She is concurrently Chairman of the Centre for Liveable Cities under the Ministry of National Development, Singapore.

Cheong received a Gold Public Administration medal in 2005 and a silver Public Administration medal in 1997. In 2010, Cheong was awarded the Her World Woman of the Year award. In 2014, Cheong was inducted into the Singapore Women's Hall of Fame.
