= Simon Tensing de Cruz =

Singaporean diplomat

Simon Tensing de Cruz (born 2 February 1954) is a Singaporean diplomat, who has been serving as the Ambassador Extraordinary and Plenipotentiary of the Republic of Singapore to Ukraine.

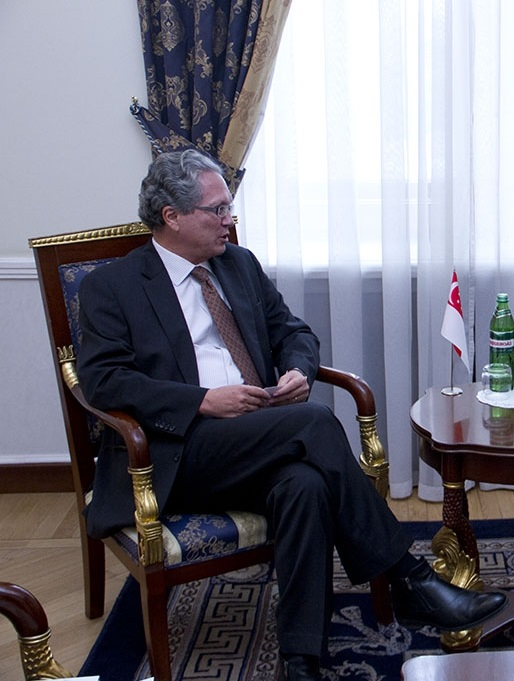
Ambassador Simon Tensing de Cruz in 2016

== Early life and education ==
De Cruz was born in the United Kingdom on 2 February 1954 to Gerald Evelyn de Cruz and Coral Alma Phipps. His elder sister is Justice Judith Prakash. He also has one younger half-brother, Adam.

He graduated from the University of Singapore (now the National University of Singapore) in 1979, majoring in political science before joining the Ministry of Foreign Affairs (MFA) that year.

== Career ==
In 1996, he was appointed as Singapore's Ambassador to the Philippines, a position he held until 1999, when he was appointed as the Ambassador of Singapore to Myanmar in 2000 and held that position until 2004.

After serving in a department of the Ministry of Foreign Affairs, he was appointed as Singapore's High Commissioner to Papua New Guinea on 29 May 2006.

On 24 September 2008, de Cruz was appointed as Singapore's Ambassador to Russia with concurrent accreditation to Ukraine, and presented his Letter of Credence to President Dmitry Medvedev on 27 February 2009.

On completing his tenure in Moscow in 2012, he continued to serve in his capacity as Singapore's Ambassador to Ukraine.
