= Geraldine Heng =

American historian

- Title: Professor of English and Comparative Literature
- Spouse: Janadas Devan
- Awards: Robert W. Hamilton Book Award 2019 The Invention of Race in the European Middle Ages; PROSE Award 2019 The Invention of Race in the European Middle Ages

Academic background
- Education: Cornell University
- Thesis: Gender Magic: Desire, Romance, and the Feminine in Sir Gawain and the Green Knight (1990)

Academic work
- Discipline: Historian
- Sub-discipline: Middle Ages
- Institutions: University of Texas at Austin

Geraldine Heng is an American historian who is the current Mildred Hajek Vacek and John Roman Vacek Chair in English and Comparative Literature (formerly Perceval Professor) at the University of Texas at Austin, where, as of November 2022, she was also affiliated with Middle Eastern studies, Women’s studies, Jewish Studies, and the Rapoport Center for Human Rights and Social Justice. Heng's work focuses on literary, social and cultural encounters between societies in the period 500–1500 CE. She is noted as a key figure in the development of postcolonial approaches to the European Middle Ages, premodern critical race studies, and critical early global studies.

== Education and career ==
Heng studied at Cornell University, completing her PhD thesis, Gender Magic: Desire, Romance, and the Feminine in Sir Gawain and the Green Knight, in 1990.

Heng coedits the Cambridge University Press Elements series in the Global Middle Ages, and the University of Pennsylvania Press series, RaceB4Race: Critical Studies of the Premodern. She is also noted for the article 'State Fatherhood: The Politics of Nationalism, Sexuality, and Race in Singapore', co-written with her husband Janadas Devan, critiquing social eugenics in Singapore. Among her various keynotes and plenaries, Heng was the keynote speaker at the 46th Annual New England Medieval Conference, 3 December 2020. Her talk was entitled 'The Politics of Race in the European Middle Ages'.

In April 2023 she was elected to the American Academy of Arts and Sciences.

== Books ==
- (ed.) Teaching the Global Middle Ages New York: Modern Language Association of America, 2022. ISBN 9781603295178
- The Global Middle Ages: An Introduction. Cambridge: Cambridge University Press, 2021. ISBN 9781009204781
- England and the Jews: How Religion and Violence Created the First Racial State in the West. Cambridge: Cambridge University Press, 2019. ISBN 9781108698184
- The Invention of Race in the European Middle Ages. New York: Cambridge University Press, 2018. ISBN 9781108422789
- Empire of Magic: Medieval Romance and the Politics of Cultural Fantasy (New York: Columbia University Press, 2003, 2004, 2012), ISBN 0231125275

== Awards ==
Her book The Invention of Race in the European Middle Ages (2018) won four awards, including the American Academy of Religion award for excellence in historical studies, the Otto Gründler book prize, the Robert W. Hamilton Book Award grand prize, and the Association of American Publishers PROSE award for world history.
