= Michael Tay =

Singaporean diplomat (born 1959)

Michael Tay Cheow Ann (born 1959) is a Singaporean diplomat who served as the Ambassador Extraordinary and Plenipotentiary of the Republic of Singapore to the Russian Federation.

== Education ==
Tay graduated from the National University of Singapore with a Master of Philosophy degree.

== Career ==
Upon graduation, he taught at the National University of Singapore for two years before joining the Ministry of Foreign Affairs (MFA). He was in charge of the Middle East, Latin America and Africa region.

Tay founded Foundation for The Arts and Social Enterprise, non-profit organisation and SingJazz, an annual music festival focusing on local and regional musicians and also a showcase for renowned international acts, in 2013

== See also ==
- Embassy of Singapore in Moscow
