= Tan Suee Chieh =

Businessman

- Born: 7 May 1959 (age 67); Malaya
- Education: London School of Economics, Columbia University

Tan Suee Chieh (simplified Chinese: 陈诸杰; traditional Chinese: 陳諸傑; pinyin: Chén Zhū Jié) is a Malaysian Singaporean business leader and former CEO. He was the CEO of NTUC Income (now known as Income Insurance) from February 2007 to September 2013, and the Group CEO of NTUC Enterprise from 1 October 2013 to 2017. He was also the President of the Institute and Faculty of Actuaries (IFoA) from 2020 to 2021 and was the first Asian to hold the position.

== Career ==
Tan served as a member of Singapore's NTUC Income Insurance Co-operative Limited Board of Directors from 2003 to 2017. Prior to that, he held the position of President, Asia Pacific Region of the SHL Group plc, a British human resource consultancy firm. From 1981 to 2001, he was with the Prudential plc and held several senior positions in the company, including Actuary of Prudential Malaysia, Chief Executive of Prudential Singapore and managing director, Established Markets of Prudential Asia.

Tan's directorships included International Cooperative and Mutual Insurance Federation and Allnations Board. Tan was also the co-chairman of the Institute of Service Excellence@SMU, and the Vice Chairman of the Singapore Children's Society Executive Committee, a member of the Board of Governors of the Asia Pacific Risk and Insurance Association, Advisory Board Member of the Center for Strategic Leadership at National University of Singapore and Sim Kee Boon Institute for Financial Economics at Singapore Management University, and trustee of the Singapore London School of Economics (LSE) Trust.

He is a Fellow of the Royal Statistical Society and Institute and Faculty of Actuaries, and he was a past president of the Life Insurance Association of Singapore, as well as the Actuarial Society of Malaysia. Tan has a first-class honors degree from the London School of Economics, and a master's degree in social organizational psychology from Columbia University, New York.

As a former CEO of Income Insurance, then known as NTUC Income, he was against a proposed acquisition of the insurer by the German multinational financial services company Allianz in 2024. The deal was eventually called off amid intense public scrutiny. During the 2025 Singaporean general election, Tan wrote an open letter to PAP politicians associated with the failed deal, most notably Ng Chee Meng and Gan Kim Yong, asking for greater transparency. Tan later endorsed Harpreet Singh Nehal, the leader of the Workers' Party (WP) team in Punggol GRC, who contested against Gan.

== Education ==
Tan graduated with first-class honours in Actuarial Science from the London School of Economics and later completed a master’s degree in Organisational Psychology.

== Personal life ==
Tan was born in Malaysia and later moved to Singapore.
