= Bilahari Kausikan =

Singaporean former diplomat

- பிலஹரி கௌசிகன்
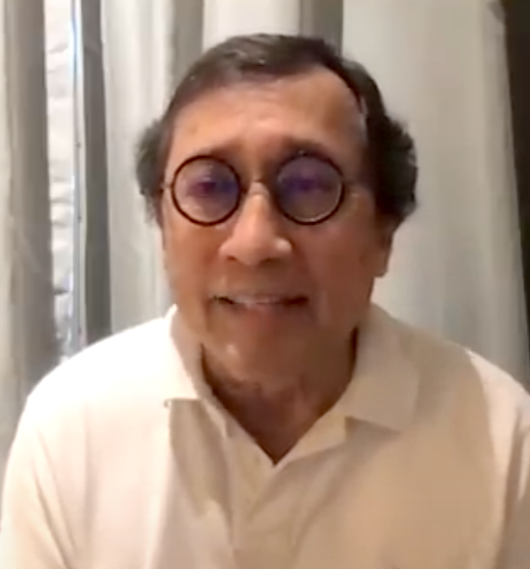
- In a Lowy Institute online discussion in 2021

Personal details
- Born: Bilahari Kim Hee Papanasam Setlur Kausikan; 1954 (age 71–72) Singapore
- Education: Columbia University; University of Singapore

Bilahari Kim Hee Papanasam Setlur Kausikan (Tamil: பிலஹரி பாபநாசம் செட்லூர் கௌசிகன், Chinese: 米金喜; Pe̍h-ōe-jī: Bí Kim-hí; born 1954) is a Singaporean retired academic, diplomat and civil servant who served as Singapore's Permanent Representative to the United Nations between 1995 and 1998.

== Early life and education ==
Kausikan's father, P. S. Raman, was a British Raj-born Indian immigrant who moved to Singapore after the Partition of India. After serving as a Singapore diplomat, the wealthy P. S. Raman married Lim Eng Neo, a Peranakan, with whom he had three children.

P. S. Raman named his son Bilahari Kim Hee Papanasam Setlur Kausikan: Bilahari is the name of a raga; Kausikan is a form of the Vedic surname Kaushik; Setlur is a Brahmin sub-caste; and Papanasam is the name of P. S. Raman's home village in Tamil Nadu. Kim Hee (金喜; Kim-hí; 'golden joy') is the Chinese name that Kausikan's mother gave him.

Kausikan graduated from the University of Singapore (merged into the National University of Singapore in 1980), majoring in political science. He subsequently received a scholarship from the Public Service Commission (PSC) to pursue a PhD in international relations at Columbia University, with the aim of becoming an academic.

During this time, he would secretly submit articles to The Straits Times under the pseudonym "Bee Kim Hee". Half way into his dissertation, he decided to drop out from the course and return to Singapore, where he joined the Singaporean Ministry of Foreign Affairs (MFA). He ultimately graduated with a Master of Arts degree from Columbia University.

== Career ==
Kausikan joined the civil service in 1981 as a foreign service officer, and was assigned to the Administrative Service in 1983.

Kausikan's father, P.S. Raman, gained Prime Minister Lee Kuan Yew's attention after he advised against editing out the video of Lee tearing while announcing Singapore's expulsion from the Malaysian Federation in 1965. Thereafter, he was appointed to various diplomatic positions, including Singapore's Ambassador to Indonesia during Konfrontasi, and subsequently as Singapore's High Commissioner to Australia and Ambassador to the Soviet Union.

After recovering from a heart attack during his tenure in Jakarta, P.S. Raman was reassigned as Singapore's High Commissioner to Australia and served in that capacity for a year and a half.

Kausikan was appointed as Singapore's Ambassador to Russia in 1994, with concurrent accreditation as Ambassador to Finland. Kausikan served as Singapore's Permanent Representative to the United Nations between 1995 and 1998, with concurrent accreditation as Singapore's High Commissioner to Canada and Ambassador to Mexico.

In 1998, Kausikan was appointed as Deputy Secretary (Foreign Affairs) at the Ministry of Foreign Affairs. He was appointed as Second Permanent Secretary in 2001, and was promoted to Permanent Secretary on 1 September 2010.

He is currently serving as Chairman of the Middle East Institute at the National University of Singapore and is a Senior Fellow at the SMU School of Social Sciences.

== Honours ==
- Pingat Pentadbiran Awam (Emas) (Public Administration Medal (Gold))
- Pingat Jasa Gemilang (Meritorious Service Medal)
- Order of Bernardo O'Higgins (Gran Cruz) by the President of Chile Ricardo Lagos, December 2002
- Oman Civil Merit Order (Second Class), by the Sultan of Oman Qaboos bin Said al Said, February 2013

== Works ==
- "Singapore: Israel in Southeast Asia?" in Beating the Odds Together: 50 Years of Singapore-Israel Ties. Ed. Mattia Tomba. Singapore: World Scientific Book, 2019. ISBN 978-981-121-468-4 OCLC 1122747159
- "China Is Messing with Your Mind" Epigram Books, 2019.
