= List of acts of the Parliament of Singapore =

This is a somewhat complete list of all Singapore Acts of Parliament which have been passed - the entire list of acts passed is available online at the Singapore Attorney-General's Chambers website, at Singapore Statutes. Approved Budgets and annual debates may be found at the Supply Act.

== Acts by year ==
=== 1869 ===
- Oaths of Office and Allegiance Act

=== 1871 ===
- Penal Code

=== 1872 ===
- Foreshores Act
- Preservation of the Peace Act (repealed on 1 November 2000)

=== 1875 ===
- Foreign Recruiting Act

=== 1881 ===
- Fees Act

=== 1886 ===
- Bills of Sale Act
- Conveyancing and Law of Property Act

=== 1893 ===
- Evidence Act

=== 1898 ===
- Pawnbrokers Act

=== 1901 ===
- Land Improvement Act (repealed on 1 April 1999)

=== 1903 ===
- Coin Act (repealed on 1 September 2001)

=== 1906 ===
- Miscellaneous Offences (Public Order and Nuisance) Act

=== 1908 ===
- Petroleum Act (repealed on 16 February 2005)

=== 1909 ===
- Apportionment of Rents Act
- Civil Law Act

=== 1913 ===
- Arms and Explosives Act

=== 1915 ===
- Public Trustee Act

=== 1921 ===
- Innkeepers Act
- Maintenance Orders (Facilities for Enforcement) Act
- Reciprocal Enforcement of Commonwealth Judgments Act

=== 1922 ===
- Decorations and Uniforms Act
- Premiums on Leases Act (repealed on 1 April 2001)

=== 1923 ===
- Debtors Act
- Local Treasury Bills Act

=== 1924 ===
- Explosive Substances Act

=== 1926 ===
- Boy Scouts Association Act
- Land Officers Powers Act (repealed on 1 November 2000)

=== 1928 ===
- Apportionment Act

=== 1929 ===
- Estate Duty Act
- Malaysia Revenue Vessels Act

=== 1933 ===
- Prisons Act

=== 1934 ===
- Distress Act
- Guardianship of Infants Act
- Legitimacy Act
- Probate and Administration Act

=== 1935 ===
- Official Secrets Act

=== 1938 ===
- Poisons Act

=== 1939 ===
- Adoption of Children Act
- Prevention of Crimes Act (repealed on 1 November 2000)

=== 1940 ===
- Land Revenue Collection Act

=== 1941 ===
- Commissions of Inquiry Act (repealed on 1 November 2007)
- Indecent Advertisements Act
- Personal Injuries (Emergency Provisions) Act

=== 1947 ===
- House to House and Street Collections Act
- Hydrogen Cyanide (Fumigation) Act
- Income Tax Act

=== 1948 ===
- International Organisations (Immunities and Privileges) Act
- Military Manoeuvres Act

=== 1949 ===
- Bills of Exchange Act
- National Emblems (Control of Display) Act

=== 1950 ===
- Betting and Sweepstake Duties Act
- Departmental Titles (Alteration) Act
- Entertainments Duty Act
- Price Control Act

=== 1951 ===
- Consular Conventions Act (repealed on 1 May 2005)
- Probation of Offenders Act

=== 1952 ===
- Mental Disorders and Treatment Act
- Private Lotteries Act (repealed on 1 April 2011)

=== 1953 ===
- Central Provident Fund Act
- Contributory Negligence and Personal Injuries Act
- Control of Rent Act (repealed on 1 April 2001)
- Local Forces (Relief of Financial Hardship) Act

=== 1954 ===
- Hotels Act
- Parliamentary Elections Act
- Singapore Polytechnic Act

=== 1955 ===
- Criminal Law (Temporary Provisions) Act
- Medicines (Advertisement and Sale) Act

=== 1956 ===
- Government Proceedings Act
- Pensions Act
- Public Service Commission Act

=== 1957 ===
- Defamation Act
- Diplomatic Privileges (Commonwealth Countries and Republic of Ireland) Act (repealed on 1 May 2005)
- Education Act

=== 1958 ===
- Employment Agencies Act
- Police Force Act
- Public Order (Preservation) Act (repealed on 16 May 2018)

=== 1959 ===
- Banishment Act
- Control of Manufacture Act
- Development Fund Act
- Frustrated Contracts Act
- Housing and Development Act
- Immigration Act
- Limitation Act
- Massage Establishments Act (repealed on 1 March 2018)
- Minister for Finance (Incorporation) Act
- Moneylenders Act
- Notaries Public Act
- Protected Areas and Protected Places Act (repealed on 18 December 2018)
- Reciprocal Enforcement of Foreign Judgments Act

=== 1960 ===
- Betting Act
- Customs Act
- Industrial Relations Act
- Internal Security Act
- Judicial Proceedings (Regulation of Reports) Act
- Motor Vehicles (Third-Party Risks and Compensation) Act
- Mutual Benefit Organisations Act
- People’s Association Act
- Prevention of Corruption Act
- Property Tax Act

=== 1961 ===
- Common Gaming Houses Act
- Economic Development Board Act
- High Court (Admiralty Jurisdiction) Act
- Kidnapping Act
- Women's Charter

=== 1962 ===
- Parliament (Privileges, Immunities and Powers) Act

=== 1964 ===
- Cattle Act
- Emergency (Essential Powers) Act

=== 1965 ===
- Animals and Birds Act
- Feeding Stuffs Act
- Housing Developers (Control and Licensing) Act
- National Registration Act
- Payroll Tax Act
- Republic of Singapore Independence Act

=== 1966 ===
- Administration of Muslim Law Act
- Air Navigation Act
- Asian Development Bank Act
- Audit Act
- Bretton Woods Agreements Act
- Cinematograph Film Hire Duty Act
- Corrosive and Explosive Substances and Offensive Weapons Act
- Exchange Control Act
- Financial Procedure Act
- Free Trade Zones Act
- Government Contracts Act
- Inheritance (Family Provision) Act
- Insurance Act
- Land Acquisition Act
- Loans (International Banks) Act

=== 1967 ===
- Companies Act
- Currency Act
- Economic Expansion Incentives (Relief from Income Tax) Act
- Finance Companies Act
- Intestate Succession Act
- Land Titles (Strata) Act
- Ngee Ann Polytechnic Act
- Undesirable Publications Act

=== 1968 ===
- Arbitration (International Investment Disputes) Act
- Diplomatic and Consular Officers (Oaths and Fees) Act
- Employment Act
- External Loans Act
- Extradition Act
- Institute of Southeast Asian Studies Act
- International Finance Corporation Act
- Jurong Town Corporation Act

=== 1969 ===
- Controlled Premises (Special Provisions) Act (repealed on 31 March 2002)
- Hire-Purchase Act

=== 1970 ===
- Banking Act
- Civil List and Pension Act
- Enlistment Act 1970
- Fisheries Act
- Metrication Act
- Monetary Authority of Singapore Act
- National Servicemen (Employment) Act
- Passports Act
- Preservation of Monuments Act

=== 1971 ===
- Chit Funds Act
- Post Office Savings Bank of Singapore Act (repealed on 21 May 1999)

=== 1972 ===
- Carriage of Goods by Sea Act
- Commercial and Industrial Security Corporation Act (repealed on 10 June 2005)
- Dangerous Fireworks Act
- Medical (Therapy, Education and Research) Act
- National Cadet Corps Act

=== 1973 ===
- Arms Offences Act
- Buildings and Common Property (Maintenance and Management) Act (repealed on 1 April 2005)
- Business Registration Act
- Census Act
- Control of Essential Supplies Act
- Factories Act
- Geneva Conventions Act
- Misuse of Drugs Act
- Multi-Level Marketing and Pyramid Selling (Prohibition) Act
- Private Investigation and Security Agencies Act
- Public Entertainments and Meetings Act

=== 1974 ===
- Electrical Workers and Contractors Licensing Act (repealed on 1 December 2002)
- Martial Arts Instruction Act (repealed on 22 December 2003)
- National Police Cadet Corps Act
- Newspaper and Printing Presses Act
- Parking Places Act
- Planning (Cancellation of Permission) Act (repealed on 8 December 2000)
- Property Tax (Surcharge) Act

=== 1975 ===
- Consumer Protection (Trade Descriptions and Safety Requirements) Act
- Maintenance Orders (Reciprocal Enforcement) Act
- Medicines Act
- Parking Places (Surcharge) Act
- Parks and Trees Act (repealed on 1 August 2005)

=== 1976 ===
- Infectious Diseases Act 1976
- Pensions (Expatriate Officers) Act

=== 1978 ===
- Hijacking of Aircraft and Protection of Aircraft and International Airports Act
- Parliamentary Pensions Act

=== 1979 ===
- Co-operative Societies Act
- Evidence (Civil Proceedings in Other Jurisdictions) Act
- Money-changing and Remittance Businesses Act
- Pharmacists Registration Act
- Sale of Commercial Properties Act

=== 1980 ===
- Criminal Procedure Code
- National University of Singapore Act
- Private Hospitals and Medical Clinics Act

=== 1981 ===
- Films Act 1981
- Legal Profession Act

=== 1982 ===
- International Enterprise Singapore Board Act

=== 1983 ===
- Development Loan Act

=== 1984 ===
- Civil Aviation Authority of Singapore Act
- HUDC Housing Estates Act

=== 1985 ===
- Appraisers and House Agents Act

=== 1986 ===
- Civil Defence Act
- Futures Trading Act (repealed on 1 October 2002)

=== 1987 ===
- Accountants Act (repealed on 1 April 2004)
- Copyright Act
- Development Loan (1987) Act
- Environmental Public Health Act
- Human Organ Transplant Act
- Intoxicating Substances Act
- Public Service (Variation of 1984 Annual Wage Increases) Act 1987
- Public Transport Council Act

=== 1988 ===
- Child Care Centres Act (repealed on 2 January 2019)
- Homes for the Aged Act
- Mass Rapid Transit Corporation Act (repealed on 1 September 1995)
- Public Service (Monthly Variable Component and Non-pensionable Annual Allowance) Act

=== 1989 ===
- Building Control Act
- Corruption (Confiscation of Benefits) Act (repealed on 13 September 1999)
- Destitute Persons Act
- Endangered Species (Import and Export) Act

=== 1990 ===
- National Science and Technology Board Act 1990 (renamed to Agency for Science, Technology and Research Act in 2002)
- Employment of Foreign Workers Act
- Maintenance of Religious Harmony Act
- Planning Act
- Prevention of Pollution of the Sea Act
- Temasek Polytechnic Act

=== 1991 ===
- Architects Act
- Land Surveyors Act
- Nanyang Technological University Act
- National Arts Council Act
- Presidential Elections Act
- Professional Engineers Act
- Radiation Protection Act 1991

=== 1992 ===
- Commodity Trading Act
- Drug Trafficking (Confiscation of Benefits) Act (repealed and renamed as the Corruption, Drug Trafficking and Other Serious Crimes (Confiscation of Benefits) Act)
- Education Endowment Scheme Act
- Government Securities Act
- Inland Revenue Authority of Singapore Act
- Institute of Technical Education Act
- Nanyang Polytechnic Act
- National Council of Social Service Act
- National Productivity Board Act (repealed on 1 April 1996)

=== 1993 ===
- Application of English Law Act
- Children and Young Persons Act 1993
- Computer Misuse Act 1993
- Control of Plants Act
- Fire Safety Act 1993
- Goods and Services Tax Act 1993
- Land Titles Act 1993
- National Heritage Board Act 1993

=== 1994 ===
- Broadcasting Act
- Charities Act 1994
- International Arbitration Act
- Judges' Remuneration Act
- Patents Act

=== 1995 ===
- Bankruptcy Act
- Contact Lens Practitioners Act
- Land Transport Authority of Singapore Act
- Legal Aid and Advice Act
- Maintenance of Parents Act
- Merchant Shipping Act
- National Library Board Act
- Pension Fund Act
- Rapid Transit Systems Act

=== 1996 ===
- Advance Medical Directive Act
- Countervailing and Anti-Dumping Duties Act
- Executive Condominium Housing Scheme Act
- Institute of Education (Repeal) Act 1996
- Maritime and Port Authority of Singapore Act
- National Parks Act

=== 1997 ===
- Civil Defence Shelter Act
- Community Mediation Centres Act
- Government Procurement Act
- Hazardous Waste (Control of Export, Import and Transit) Act

=== 1998 ===
- Boundaries and Survey Maps Act
- Computer Misuse (Amendment) Act 1998
- Control of Vectors and Pesticides Act
- Electronic Transactions Act
- Films (Amendment) Act 1998
- Geographical Indications Act
- Holidays Act
- Merchant Shipping (Civil Liability and Compensation for Oil Pollution) Act
- Post Office Savings Bank of Singapore (Transfer of Undertakings and Dissolution) Act
- Princess Elizabeth Fund (Repeal) Act 1998
- Trade Marks Act 1998

=== 1999 ===
- Building and Construction Authority Act
- Corruption, Drug Trafficking and Other Serious Crimes (Confiscation of Benefits) Act
- Dentists Act
- Environmental Pollution Control Act
- Exchanges (Demutualisation and Merger) Act
- Final Supply (FY1998) Act 1999
- Infectious Diseases (Amendment) Act 1999
- Info-communications Development Authority of Singapore Act
- Insurance Intermediaries Act
- Layout-Designs of Integrated Circuits Act
- Nurses and Midwives Act
- Postal Services Act
- Sewerage and Drainage Act
- Telecommunications Act 1999

=== 2000 ===
- Agri-Food and Veterinary Authority Act (repealed on 1 April 2019)
- Chemical Weapons (Prohibition) Act
- Compulsory Education Act
- Defence Science and Technology Agency Act
- Developmental Investment Fund Act
- Medical and Elderly Care Endowment Schemes Act
- Mutual Assistance in Criminal Matters Act
- National Science and Technology Board (Amendment) Act 2000
- Oaths and Declarations Act 2000
- Political Donations Act
- Prisons (Amendment) Act 2000
- Registered Designs Act
- Singapore Management University Act 2000
- Traditional Chinese Medicine Practitioners Act 2000

=== 2001 ===
- Arbitration Act
- Banking (Amendment) Act 2001
- Children Development Co-Savings Act
- Civil Service College Act
- Contracts (Rights of Third Parties) Act
- Control of Rent (Abolition) Act 2001
- District Cooling Act
- Education Service Incentive Payment Act
- Electricity Act
- Energy Market Authority of Singapore Act
- Financial Advisers Act
- Gas Act
- Health Promotion Board Act
- Health Sciences Authority Act
- Home Affairs Uniformed Services Superannuation Act
- Insurance (Amendment) Act 2001
- Intellectual Property Office of Singapore Act
- Lifelong Learning Endowment Fund Act 2001
- Parliamentary Elections (Amendment) Act 2001
- Parliamentary Elections (Amendment No. 2) Act 2001
- Parliamentary Elections (Temporary Suspension of Overseas Voting) Act 2001
- Public Utilities Act
- Securities and Futures Act
- Singapore Business Federation Act
- United Nations Act

=== 2002 ===
- Final Supply (FY 2001) Act 2002
- Goods and Services Tax (Amendment) Act 2002
- International Development Association Act
- Media Development Authority of Singapore Act
- National Environment Agency Act
- National Science and Technology Board (Amendment) Act 2002
- Payment and Settlement Systems (Finality and Netting) Act
- Republic Polytechnic Act
- Singapore Productivity and Standards Board (Amendment) Act 2002
- Terrorism (Suppression of Financing) Act

=== 2003 ===
- Computer Misuse (Amendment) Act 2003
- Consumer Protection (Fair Trading) Act
- Infectious Diseases (Amendment) Act 2003
- Infectious Diseases (Amendment No. 2) Act 2003
- Maritime Offences Act
- Martial Arts Instruction (Repeal) Act 2003
- Singapore Examinations and Assessment Board Act
- Singapore Workforce Development Agency Act 2003

=== 2004 ===
- Accountants Act 2004
- Accounting and Corporate Regulatory Authority Act 2004
- Building and Construction Industry Security of Payment Act 2004
- Building Maintenance and Strata Management Act 2004
- Business Trusts Act 2004
- Competition Act 2004
- Copyright (Amendment) Act 2004
- Human Cloning and Other Prohibited Practices Act 2004
- Manufacture of Optical Discs Act 2004
- Plant Varieties Protection Act 2004
- Police Force Act 2004
- Supply Act 2004

=== 2005 ===
- Administration of Muslim Law (Amendment) Act 2005
- Appraisers and House Agents (Amendment) Act 2005
- Architects (Amendment) Act 2005
- Betting and Sweepstake Duties (Amendment) Act 2005
- Biological Agents and Toxins Act 2005
- Central Provident Fund (Amendment) Act 2005
- CISCO (Dissolution) Act 2005
- Community Care Endowment Fund Act 2005
- Companies (Amendment) Act 2005
- Competition (Amendment) Act 2005
- Copyright (Amendment) Act 2005
- Deposit Insurance Act 2005
- Diplomatic and Consular Relations Act 2005
- Education Endowment Scheme (Amendment) Act 2005
- Financial Advisers (Amendment) Act 2005
- Goods and Services Tax (Amendment) Act 2005
- Housing and Development (Amendment) Act 2005
- Income Tax (Amendment) Act 2005
- Inland Revenue Authority of Singapore (Amendment) Act 2005
- Moneylenders (Amendment) Act 2005
- Legal Profession (Amendment) Act 2005
- Limited Liability Partnerships Act 2005
- Money-changing and Remittance Businesses (Amendment) Act 2005
- Nanyang Technological University (Corporatisation) Act 2005
- National University of Singapore (Corporatisation) Act 2005
- Nurses and Midwives (Amendment) Act 2005
- Parking Places (Amendment) Act 2005
- Parks and Trees Act 2005
- Parliamentary Elections (Amendment) Act 2005
- Presidential Elections (Amendment) Act 2005
- Professional Engineers (Amendment) Act 2005
- Public Transport Council (Amendment) Act 2005
- Registration of Criminals (Amendment) Act 2005
- Securities and Futures (Amendment) Act 2005
- Singapore Management University (Amendment) Act 2005
- Small Claims Tribunals (Amendment) Act 2005
- Stamp Duties (Amendment) Act 2005
- Stamp Duties (Amendment No. 2) Act 2005
- Statutes (Miscellaneous Amendments and Repeal) Act 2005
- Statutes (Miscellaneous Amendments) (No. 2) Act 2005
- Subordinate Courts (Amendment) Act 2005
- Supplementary Supply (FY 2004) Act 2005
- Supply Act 2005
- Telecommunications (Amendment) Act 2005
- Town Councils (Amendment) Act 2005
- Trust Companies Act 2005
- Weights and Measures (Amendment) Act 2005

=== 2006 ===
- Accountants (Amendment) Act 2006
- Casino Control Act 2006
- Central Provident Fund (Amendment) Act 2006
- Electricity (Amendment) Act 2006
- Endangered Species (Import and Export) Act 2006
- Enlistment (Amendment) Act 2006
- Intoxicating Substances (Amendment) Act 2006
- Misuse of Drugs (Amendment) Act 2006
- Moneylenders (Amendment) Act 2006
- Mutual Assistance in Criminal Matters (Amendment) Act 2006
- National Research Fund Act 2006
- Payment Systems (Oversight) Act 2006
- Private Lotteries (Amendment) Act 2006
- Residential Property (Amendment) Act 2006
- Road Traffic (Amendment) Act 2006
- Singapore Armed Forces (Amendment) Act 2006
- Supplementary Supply (FY2005) Act 2006
- Supply Act 2006
- Workplace Safety and Health Act 2006

=== 2007 ===
- Accounting Standards Act 2007
- Agency for Science, Technology and Research (Amendment) Act 2007
- Air Navigation (Amendment) Act 2007
- Arms and Explosives (Amendment) Act 2007
- Banking (Amendment) Act 2007
- Building Control (Amendment) Act 2007
- Carriage by Air (Montreal Convention, 1999) Act 2007
- Central Provident Fund (Amendment) Act 2007
- Central Provident Fund (Amendment No. 2) Act 2007
- Charities (Amendment) Act 2007
- Chemical Weapons (Prohibition) (Amendment) Act 2007
- Children Development Co-Savings (Amendment) Act 2007
- Civil Aviation Authority of Singapore (Amendment) Act 2007
- Commodity Trading (Amendment) Act 2007
- Competition (Amendment) Act 2007
- Constitution of the Republic of Singapore (Amendment) Act 2007
- Corruption, Drug Trafficking and Other Serious Crimes (Confiscation of Benefits) (Amendment) Act 2007
- Dentists (Amendment) Act 2007
- Economic Expansion Incentives (Relief from Income Tax) (Amendment) Act 2007
- Education Endowment Scheme (Amendment) Act 2007
- Education Endowment Scheme (Amendment No. 2) Act 2007
- Employment of Foreign Workers (Amendment) Act 2007
- Environmental Pollution Control (Amendment) Act 2007
- Financial Procedure (Amendment) Act 2007
- Gas (Amendment) Act 2007
- Geneva Conventions (Amendment) Act 2007
- Goods and Services Tax (Amendment) Act 2007
- Health Products Act 2007
- Income Tax (Amendment) Act 2007
- Income Tax (Amendment No. 2) Act 2007
- Inquiries Act 2007
- Land Acquisition (Amendment) Act 2007
- Land Titles (Strata) (Amendment) Act 2007
- Land Transport Authority of Singapore (Amendment) Act 2007
- Legal Profession (Amendment) Act 2007
- Monetary Authority of Singapore (Amendment) Act 2007
- Monetary Authority of Singapore (Amendment No. 2) Act 2007
- National Registry of Diseases Act 2007
- Ngee Ann Kongsi (Incorporation) (Amendment) Act 2007
- Optometrists and Opticians Act 2007
- Passports Act 2007
- Penal Code (Amendment) Act 2007
- Pharmacists Registration Act 2007
- Postal Services (Amendment) Act 2007
- Private Security Industry Act 2007
- Property Tax (Surcharge) (Abolition) Act 2007
- Public Service Commission (Amendment) Act 2007
- Radiation Protection Act 2007
- Secondhand Goods Dealers Act 2007
- Singapore Armed Forces (Amendment) Act 2007
- Spam Control Act 2007
- Statutes (Miscellaneous Amendments) Act 2007
- Strategic Goods (Control) (Amendment) Act 2007
- Supplementary Supply (FY 2006) Act 2007
- Supply Act 2007
- Terrorism (Suppression of Bombings) Act 2007
- Trade Marks (Amendment) Act 2007

=== 2008 ===
- Administration of Muslim Law (Amendment) Act 2008
- Central Provident Fund (Amendment) Act 2008
- Children Development Co-Savings (Amendment) Act 2008
- Consumer Protection (Fair Trading) (Amendment) Act 2008
- Constitution of the Republic of Singapore (Amendment) Act 2008
- Co-operative Societies (Amendment) Act 2008
- Customs (Amendment) Act 2008
- Economic Development Board (Amendment) Act 2008
- Employment (Amendment) Act 2008
- Environmental Public Health (Amendment) Act 2008
- Estate Duty (Abolition) Act 2008
- Financial Advisers (Amendment) Act 2008
- Goods and Services Tax (Amendment) Act 2008
- Housing and Development (Amendment) Act 2008
- Human Organ Transplant (Amendment) Act 2008
- Income Tax (Amendment) Act 2008
- Infectious Diseases (Amendment) Act 2008
- Internationally Protected Persons Act 2008
- Legal Profession (Amendment) Act 2008
- Limited Partnerships Act 2008
- Mental Capacity Act 2008
- Mental Health (Care and Treatment) Act 2008
- Merchant Shipping (Civil Liability and Compensation for Bunker Oil Pollution) Act 2008
- Moneylenders Act 2008
- Parliamentary Elections (Amendment) Act 2008
- Patents (Amendment) Act 2008
- Property Tax (Amendment) Act 2008
- Public Transport Council (Amendment) Act 2008
- Securities and Futures (Amendment) Act 2008
- Singapore Totalisator Board (Amendment) Act 2008
- Singapore Tourism (Cess Collection) (Amendment) Act 2008
- Skills Development Levy (Amendment) Act 2008
- Stamp Duties (Amendment) Act 2008
- Statutes (Miscellaneous Amendments) Act 2008
- Statutes (Miscellaneous Amendments) (No. 2) Act 2008
- Supplementary Supply (FY 2007) Act 2008
- Supply Act 2008
- Workmen's Compensation (Amendment) Act 2008
- Workplace Safety and Health (Amendment) Act 2008

=== 2009 ===
- Bankruptcy (Amendment) Act 2009
- Building and Construction Authority (Amendment) Act 2009
- Business Registration (Amendment) Act 2009
- Casino Control (Amendment) Act 2009
- Central Provident Fund (Amendment) Act 2009
- Civil Aviation Authority of Singapore Act 2009
- Civil Law (Amendment) Act 2009
- Copyright (Amendment) Act 2009
- Criminal Law (Temporary Provisions) (Amendment) Act 2009
- Goods and Services Tax (Amendment) Act 2009
- Human Organ Transplant (Amendment) Act 2009
- Films (Amendment) Act 2009
- Income Tax (Amendment) Act 2009
- Income Tax (Amendment) (Exchange of Information) Act 2009
- Insurance (Amendment) Act 2009
- International Arbitration (Amendment) Act 2009
- International Interests in Aircraft Equipment Act 2009
- Legal Profession (Amendment) Act 2009
- Preservation of Monuments Act 2009
- Private Education Act 2009
- Public Order Act 2009
- Quorums of Statutory Boards (Miscellaneous Amendments) Act 2009
- Singapore Armed Forces (Amendment) Act 2009
- State Lands (Amendment) Act 2009
- Supplementary Supply (FY 2008) Act 2009
- Supply Act 2009

=== 2010 ===
- Central Provident Fund (Amendment) Act 2010
- Charities (Amendment) Act 2010
- Civil Defence (Amendment) Act 2010
- Constitution of the Republic of Singapore (Amendment) Act 2010
- Coroners Act 2010
- Criminal Procedure Code 2010
- Economic Expansion Incentives (Relief from Income Tax) (Amendment) Act 2010
- Electronic Transactions Act 2010
- Estate Agents Act 2010
- Goods and Services Tax (Amendment) Act 2010
- Government Securities (Amendment) Act 2010
- Hindu Endowments (Amendment) Act 2010
- Hostage Taking Act 2010
- Housing and Development (Amendment) Act 2010
- Income Tax (Amendment) Act 2010
- Industrial Relations (Amendment) Act 2010
- International Child Abduction Act 2010
- Land Titles (Strata) (Amendment) Act 2010
- Maintenance of Parents (Amendment) Act 2010
- Medical Registration (Amendment) Act 2010
- Moneylenders (Amendment) Act 2010
- National Productivity Fund Act 2010
- Parliamentary Elections (Amendment) Act 2010
- Presidential Elections (Amendment) Act 2010
- Property Tax (Amendment) Act 2010
- Rapid Transit Systems (Amendment) Act 2010
- Residential Property (Amendment) Act 2010
- Road Traffic (Amendment) Act 2010
- Smoking (Control of Advertisements and Sale of Tobacco) (Amendment) Act 2010
- Stamp Duties (Amendment) Act 2010
- Stamp Duties (Amendment No. 2) Act 2010
- Statistics (Amendment) Act 2010
- Statutes (Miscellaneous Amendments) Act 2010
- Subordinate Courts (Amendment) Act 2010
- Supplementary Supply (FY 2009) Act 2010
- Supply Act 2010
- Supreme Court of Judicature (Amendment) Act 2010

=== 2011 ===
- Allied Health Professions Act 2011
- Amusement Rides Safety Act 2011
- Central Provident Fund (Amendment) Act 2011
- Children and Young Persons (Amendment) Act 2011
- Children Development Co-Savings (Amendment) Act 2011
- Conveyancing (Miscellaneous Amendments) Act 2011
- Customs (Amendment) Act 2011
- Deposit Insurance and Policy Owners' Protection Schemes Act 2011
- Employment Agencies (Amendment) Act 2011
- Environmental Protection and Management (Amendment) Act 2011
- Income Tax (Amendment) Act 2011
- Insurance (Amendment) Act 2011
- Goods and Services Tax (Amendment) Act 2011
- Legal Profession (Amendment) Act 2011
- Private Lotteries Act 2011
- Retirement Age (Amendment) Act 2011
- Singapore University of Technology and Design Act 2011
- Stamp Duties (Amendment) Act 2011
- Supplementary Supply (FY 2010) Act 2011
- Supply Act 2011
- Telecommunications (Amendment) Act 2011
- United Nations Personnel Act 2011
- Women's Charter (Amendment) Act 2011
- Work Injury Compensation (Amendment) Act 2011
- Workplace Safety and Health (Amendment) Act 2011

=== 2012 ===
- Building Control (Amendment) Act 2012
- Casino Control (Amendment) Act 2012
- Central Provident Fund (Amendment) Act 2012
- Civil Law (Amendment) Act 2012
- Civil List and Pension (Amendment) Act 2012
- Consumer Protection (Fair Trading) Amendment) Act 2012
- Criminal Procedure Code (Amendment) Act 2012
- Economic Expansion Incentives (Relief from Income Tax) (Amendment) Act 2012
- Employment of Foreign Manpower (Amendment) Act 2012
- Energy Conservation Act 2012
- Evidence (Amendment) Act 2012
- Financial Advisers (Amendment) Act 2012
- Foreign Limitation Periods Act 2012
- Goods and Services Tax (Amendment) Act 2012
- Goods and Services Tax Voucher Fund Act 2012
- HUDC Housing Estates (Amendment) Act 2012
- Immigration (Amendment) Act 2012
- Income Tax (Amendment) Act 2012
- Intellectual Property (Miscellaneous Amendments) Act 2012
- International Arbitration (Amendment) Act 2012
- Land Transport Authority of Singapore (Amendment) Act 2012
- Legal Profession (Amendment) Act 2012
- Misuse of Drugs (Amendment) Act 2012
- Moneylenders (Amendment) Act 2012
- Parliamentary Pensions (Abolition) Act 2012
- Patents (Amendment) Act 2012
- Penal Code (Amendment) Act 2012
- Personal Data Protection Act 2012
- Public Utilities (Amendment) Act 2012
- Road Traffic (Amendment) Act 2012
- Securities and Futures (Amendment) Act 2012
- Sewerage and Drainage (Amendment) Act 2012
- Statutes (Miscellaneous Amendments) Act 2012
- Statutes (Miscellaneous Amendments) (No. 2) Act 2012
- Supplementary Supply (FY2011) Act 2012
- Supply Act 2012
- Voluntary Sterilization (Amendment) Act 2012

=== 2013 ===
- Central Provident Fund (Amendment) Act 2013
- Child Development Co-Savings (Amendment) Act 2013
- Computer Misuse (Amendment) Act 2013
- Criminal Law (Temporary Provisions) (Amendment) Act 2013
- Economic Expansion Incentives (Relief from Income Tax) (Amendment) Act 2013
- Employment, Parental Leave and Other Measures Act 2013
- Financial Holding Companies Act 2013
- Financial Institutions (Miscellaneous Amendments) Act 2013
- Fire Safety (Amendment) Act 2013
- Goods and Services Tax (Amendment) Act 2013
- Housing Developers (Control and Licensing) (Amendment) Act 2013
- Income Tax (Amendment) Act 2013
- Insurance (Amendment) Act 2013
- Jurong Town Corporation (Amendment) Act 2013
- Legal Aid and Advice (Amendment) Act 2013
- Monetary Authority of Singapore (Amendment) Act 2013
- Motor Vehicles (Third-Party Risks and Compensation) (Amendment) Act 2013
- Payment Systems (Oversight) (Amendment) Act 2013
- Property Tax (Amendment) Act 2013
- Road Traffic (Amendment) Act 2013
- Singapore Accountancy Commission Act 2013
- Stamp Duties (Amendment) Act 2013
- Status of Children (Assisted Reproduction Technology) Act 2013
- Supplementary Supply (FY 2012) Act 2013
- Supply Act 2013
- Terrorism (Suppression of Financing) (Amendment) Act 2013

=== 2014 ===
- Accounting and Corporate Regulatory Authority (Amendment) Act 2014
- Air Navigation (Amendment) Act 2014
- Animals and Birds (Amendment) Act 2014
- Attorney-General (Additional Functions) Act 2014
- Business Names Registration Act 2014
- Companies (Amendment) Act 2014
- Constitution of the Republic of Singapore (Amendment) Act 2014
- Copyright (Amendment) Act 2014
- Corruption, Drug Trafficking and Other Serious Crimes (Confiscation of Benefits) (Amendment) Act 2014
- Education Endowment and Savings Schemes (Amendment) Act 2014
- Environmental Public Health (Amendment) Act 2014
- Family Justice Act 2014
- Geographical Indications Act 2014
- Goods and Services Tax (Amendment) Act 2014
- Government Procurement (Amendment) Act 2014
- Income Tax (Amendment) Act 2014
- Judges' Remuneration (Amendment) Act 2014
- Land Acquisition (Amendment) Act 2014
- Land Titles (Amendment) Act 2014
- Legal Profession (Amendment) Act 2014
- Merchant Shipping (Maritime Labour Convention) Act 2014
- Mutual Assistance in Criminal Matters (Amendment) Act 2014
- Pioneer Generation Fund Act 2014
- Plant Varieties Protection (Amendment) Act 2014
- Prevention of Human Trafficking Act 2014
- Prisons (Amendment) Act 2014
- Protection from Harassment Act 2014
- Public Entertainments and Meetings (Amendment) Act 2014
- Public Order (Additional Temporary Measures) Act 2014
- Public Trustee (Amendment) Act 2014
- Radiation Protection (Amendment) Act 2014
- Rapid Transit Systems (Amendment) Act 2014
- Regulation of Imports and Exports (Amendment) Act 2014
- Remote Gambling Act 2014
- Road Traffic (Amendment) Act 2014
- Singapore Institute of Technology Act 2014
- Singapore Tourism Board (Amendment) Act 2014
- Stamp Duties (Amendment) Act 2014
- Statutes (Miscellaneous Amendments) Act 2014
- Statutes (Miscellaneous Amendments) (No. 2) Act 2014
- Statutes (Miscellaneous Amendments – Deputy Attorney-General) Act 2014
- Subordinate Courts (Amendment) Act 2014
- Supplementary Supply (FY 2013) Act 2014
- Supply Act 2014
- Supreme Court of Judicature (Amendment) Act 2014
- Transboundary Haze Pollution Act 2014

=== 2015 ===
- Asian Infrastructure Investment Bank Act 2015
- Bankruptcy (Amendment) Act 2015
- Bus Services Industry Act 2015
- Civil Aviation Authority of Singapore (Amendment) Act 2015
- Community Disputes Resolution Act 2015
- Constitution of the Republic of Singapore (Amendment) Act 2015
- Deep Seabed Mining Act 2015
- Employment (Amendment) Act 2015
- Financial Advisers (Amendment) Act 2015
- Foreign Employee Dormitories Act 2015
- Government Securities (Amendment) Act 2015
- Housing and Development (Amendment) Act 2015
- Human Biomedical Research Act 2015
- Industrial Relations (Amendment) Act 2015
- Institute of Southeast Asian Studies (Amendment) Act 2015
- Insurance (Amendment) Act 2015
- Land Acquisition (Amendment) Act 2015
- Liquor Control (Supply and Consumption) Act 2015
- Maritime Offences (Amendment) Act 2015
- MediShield Life Scheme Act 2015
- Monetary Authority of Singapore (Amendment) Act 2015
- Organised Crime Act 2015
- Pawnbrokers Act 2015
- Police Force (Amendment) Act 2015
- Public Transport Council (Amendment) Act 2015
- Silver Support Scheme Act 2015
- State Lands (Amendment) Act 2015
- Supplementary Supply (FY 2014) Act 2015
- Supply Act 2015
- Third-Party Taxi Booking Service Providers Act 2015
- Unmanned Aircraft (Public Safety and Security) Act 2015

=== 2016 ===
- Administration of Justice (Protection) Act 2016
- Banking (Amendment) Act 2016
- Bretton Woods Agreements (Amendment) Act 2016
- Central Provident Fund (Amendment) Act 2016
- Central Provident Fund (Amendment No. 2) Act 2016
- Child Development Co-Savings (Amendment) Act 2016
- Child Development Co-Savings (Amendment No. 2) Act 2016
- Choice of Court Agreements Act 2016
- Constitution of the Republic of Singapore (Amendment) Act 2016
- Consumer Protection (Fair Trading) (Amendment) Act 2016
- Credit Bureau Act 2016
- Economic Expansion Incentives (Relief from Income Tax) (Amendment) Act 2016
- Employment Claims Act 2016
- Final Supply (FY 2015) Act 2016
- Fire Safety (Amendment) Act 2016
- Goods and Services Tax (Amendment) Act 2016
- Government Technology Agency Act 2016
- Income Tax (Amendment) Act 2016
- Income Tax (Amendment No. 2) Act 2016
- Income Tax (Amendment No. 3) Act 2016
- Info-communications Media Development Authority Act 2016
- Mental Capacity (Amendment) Act 2016
- Merchant Shipping (Maritime Labour Convention) (Amendment) Act 2016
- National Environment Agency (Miscellaneous Amendments) Act 2016
- National Registration (Amendment) Act 2016
- Pioneer Generation Fund (Amendment) Act 2016
- Registration of Criminals (Amendment) Act 2016
- Singapore Workforce Development Agency (Amendment) Act 2016
- SkillsFuture Singapore Agency Act 2016
- Statutes (Miscellaneous Amendments) Act 2016
- Supply Act 2016
- Telecommunications (Amendment) Act 2016
- Tobacco (Control of Advertisements and Sale) (Amendment) Act 2016
- Women's Charter (Amendment) Act 2016

=== 2017 ===
- Active Mobility Act 2017
- Administration of Muslim Law (Amendment) Act 2017
- Architects (Amendment) Act 2017
- Audit (Amendment) Act 2017
- Building Maintenance and Strata Management (Amendment) Act 2017
- Central Provident Fund (Amendment) Act 2017
- Civil Law (Amendment) Act 2017
- Companies (Amendment) Act 2017
- Computer Misuse and Cybersecurity Act (Amendment) 2017
- Early Childhood Development Centres Act 2017
- Energy Conservation (Amendment) Act 2017
- Goods and Services Tax (Amendment) Act 2017
- Home Team Corps Act 2017
- Income Tax (Amendment) Act 2017
- Infrastructure Protection Act 2017
- International Enterprise Singapore Board (Amendment) Act 2017
- Jurong Town Corporation (Amendment) Act 2017
- Limited Liability Partnerships (Amendment) Act 2017
- Maritime and Port Authority of Singapore (Amendment) Act 2017
- Massage Establishments Act 2017
- Mediation Act 2017
- Merchant Shipping (Wreck Removal) Act 2017
- Monetary Authority of Singapore (Amendment) Act 2017
- Parks and Trees (Amendment) Act 2017
- Patents (Amendment) Act 2017
- Planning (Amendment) Act 2017
- Presidential Elections (Amendment) Act 2017
- Prevention of Pollution of the Sea (Amendment) Act 2017
- Professional Engineers (Amendment) Act 2017
- Property Tax (Amendment) Act 2017
- Public Entertainments and Meetings (Amendment) Act 2017
- Public Order (Amendment) Act 2017
- Road Traffic (Amendment) Act 2017
- Registered Designs (Amendment) Act 2017
- Retirement and Re-employment (Amendment) Act 2017
- Sale of Food (Amendment) Act 2017
- Securities and Futures (Amendment) Act 2017
- Singapore University of Social Sciences Act 2017
- Stamp Duties (Amendment) Act 2017
- Supplementary Supply (FY 2016) Act 2017
- Supply Act 2017
- Terrorism (Suppression of Misuse of Radioactive Material) Act 2017
- The Kwong-Wai-Shiu Free Hospital (Transfer of Undertaking and Dissolution) Act 2017
- Tobacco (Control of Advertisements and Sale) (Amendment) Act 2017
- Town Councils (Amendment) Act 2017
- Travel Agents (Amendment) Act 2017
- Trustees (Amendment) Act 2017
- Workplace Safety and Health (Amendment) Act 2017

=== 2018 ===
- Aviation (Miscellaneous Amendments) Act 2018
- Building and Construction Industry Security of Payment (Amendment) Act 2018
- Carbon Pricing Act 2018
- Charities (Amendment) Act 2018
- Civil Defence and Other Matters Act 2018
- Common Services Tunnels Act 2018
- Companies (Amendment) Act 2018
- Competition (Amendment) Act 2018
- Co-operative Societies (Amendment) Act 2018
- Criminal Justice Reform Act 2018
- Criminal Law (Temporary Provisions) (Amendment) Act 2018
- Cross-Border Railways Act 2018
- Customs (Amendment) Act 2018
- Cybersecurity Act 2018
- Deposit Insurance and Policy Owners' Protection Schemes (Amendment) Act 2018
- Developers (Anti-Money Laundering and Terrorism Financing) Act 2018
- Economic Expansion Incentives (Relief from Income Tax) (Amendment) Act 2018
- Electricity (Amendment) Act 2018
- Employment (Amendment) Act 2018
- Enterprise Singapore Board Act 2018
- Environmental Public Health (Amendment) Act 2018
- Evidence (Amendment) Act 2018
- Films (Amendment) Act 2018
- Gas (Amendment) Act 2018
- Goods and Services Tax (Amendment) Act 2018
- Immigration (Amendment) Act 2018
- Income Tax (Amendment) Act 2018
- Insolvency, Restructuring and Dissolution Act 2018
- Intellectual Property (Border Enforcement) Act 2018
- Land Transport Authority of Singapore (Amendment) Act 2018
- Land Transport (Enforcement Measures) Act 2018
- Legal Aid and Advice (Amendment) Act 2018
- Legal Profession (Amendment) Act 2018
- Moneylenders (Amendment) Act 2018
- National Library Board (Amendment) Act 2018
- Parking Places (Amendment) Act 2018
- Parliamentary Elections (Amendment) Act 2018
- Payment and Settlement Systems (Finality and Netting) (Amendment) Act 2018
- Public Order and Safety (Special Powers) Act 2018
- Public Sector (Governance) Act 2018
- Public Utilities (Amendment) Act 2018
- Regulation of Imports and Exports (Amendment) Act 2018
- Serious Crimes and Counter-Terrorism (Miscellaneous Amendments) Act 2018
- Singapore Tourism (Cess Collection) (Amendment) Act 2018
- Small Claims Tribunals (Amendment) Act 2018
- Smoking (Prohibition in Certain Places) (Amendment) Act 2018
- Stamp Duties (Amendment) Act 2018
- Supplementary Supply (FY 2017) Act 2018
- Supply Act 2018
- Supreme Court of Judicature (Amendment) Act 2018
- Supreme Court of Judicature (Amendment No. 2) Act 2018
- Tokyo Convention (Amendment) Act 2018
- Transport Safety Investigations Act 2018
- Variable Capital Companies Act 2018
- Vulnerable Adults Act 2018

=== 2019 ===
- Air Navigation (Amendment) Act 2019
- CareShield Life and Long-Term Care Act 2019
- Central Provident Fund (Amendment) Act 2019
- Chemical Weapons (Prohibition) (Amendment) Act 2019
- Children and Young Persons (Amendment) Act 2019
- Constitution of the Republic of Singapore (Amendment) Act 2019
- Criminal Law Reform Act 2019
- Criminal Procedure Code (Amendment) Act 2019
- Currency (Amendment) Act 2019
- Fire Safety (Amendment) Act 2019
- Goods and Services Tax (Amendment) Act 2019
- Home Team Science and Technology Agency Act 2019
- Home Affairs Uniformed Services Superannuation (Amendment) Act 2019
- Income Tax (Amendment) Act 2019
- Infectious Diseases (Amendment) Act 2019
- Intellectual Property (Dispute Resolution) Act 2019
- Judges' Remuneration (Amendment) Act 2019
- Maintenance of Religious Harmony (Amendment) Act 2019
- Merchant Shipping (Miscellaneous Amendments) Act 2019
- Misuse of Drugs (Amendment) Act 2019
- National Parks Board (Amendment) Act 2019
- Payment Services Act 2019
- Pioneer Generation Fund (Amendment) Act 2019
- Point-to-Point Passenger Transport Industry Act 2019
- Precious Stones and Precious Metals (Prevention of Money Laundering and Terrorism Financing) Act 2019
- Protection from Harassment (Amendment) Act 2019
- Protection from Online Falsehoods and Manipulation Act 2019
- Reciprocal Enforcement of Commonwealth Judgments (Repeal) Act 2019
- Reciprocal Enforcement of Foreign Judgments (Amendment) Act 2019
- Resource Sustainability Act 2019
- Road Traffic (Amendment) Act 2019
- Singapore Food Agency Act 2019
- Supplementary Supply (FY 2018) Act 2019
- Supply Act 2019
- Supreme Court of Judicature (Amendment) Act 2019
- Tobacco (Control of Advertisements and Sale) (Amendment) Act 2019
- Traditional Chinese Medicine Practitioners (Amendment) Act 2019
- Variable Capital Companies (Miscellaneous Amendments) Act 2019
- Women's Charter (Amendment) Act 2019
- Work Injury Compensation Act 2019

=== 2020 ===
- Active Mobility (Amendment) Act 2020
- Active Mobility (Amendment No. 2) Act 2020
- Banking (Amendment) Act 2020
- Building Control (Amendment) Act 2020
- Constitution of the Republic of Singapore (Amendment) Act 2020
- COVID-19 (Temporary Measures) Act 2020
- COVID-19 (Temporary Measures for Solemnization and Registration of Marriages) Act 2020
- Economic Expansion Incentives (Relief from Income Tax) (Amendment) Act 2020
- Estate Agents (Amendment) Act 2020
- Geographical Indications (Amendment) Act 2020
- Goods and Services Tax Voucher Fund (Amendment) Act 2020
- Hazardous Waste (Control of Export, Import and Transit) (Amendment) Act 2020
- Healthcare Services Act 2020
- High Court (Admiralty Jurisdiction) (Amendment) Act 2020
- Hindu Endowments (Amendment) Act 2020
- Merchant Shipping (Maritime Labour Convention) (Amendment) Act 2020
- National Environment Agency (Amendment) Act 2020
- Parliamentary Elections (COVID-19 Special Arrangements) Act 2020
- Public Utilities (Amendment) Act 2020
- Revised Supplementary Supply (FY 2020) Act 2020
- Shared Mobility Enterprises (Control and Licensing) Act 2020
- Singapore Convention on Mediation Act 2020
- Small Motorised Vehicles (Safety) Act 2020
- Statutes (Miscellaneous Amendments) Act 2020
- Supplementary Supply (FY 2019) Act 2020
- Supply Act 2020
- Wild Animals and Birds (Amendment) Act 2020
