= Revenue house (disambiguation) =

A revenue house is a type of multi-family residential house with specific architecture which evolved in Europe during 18-19th centuries.

Revenue house or Revenue House may also refer to:

- Revenue house, a colloquial term for tax and revenue offices in various places
- Revenue House, Singapore, a commercial building which houses the Inland Revenue Authority of Singapore
- Revenue House, Cork, a building which houses Irish Revenue Commissioners for the South West Region
- Revenue House, Karachi, a building of the Board of Revenue, Sindh
