= Inland Revenue Authority of Singapore =

Singaporean government board in charge of tax collection

Agency overview
- Formed: 1 September 1992; 33 years ago
- Preceding agency: Inland Revenue Department
- Jurisdiction: Government of Singapore
- Headquarters: 55 Newton Road, Revenue House, Singapore 307987
- Agency executives: Tan Ching Yee, Chairman; Ow Fook Chuen, Commissioner
- Parent agency: Ministry of Finance
- Website: www.iras.gov.sg
- Agency ID: T08GB0020K

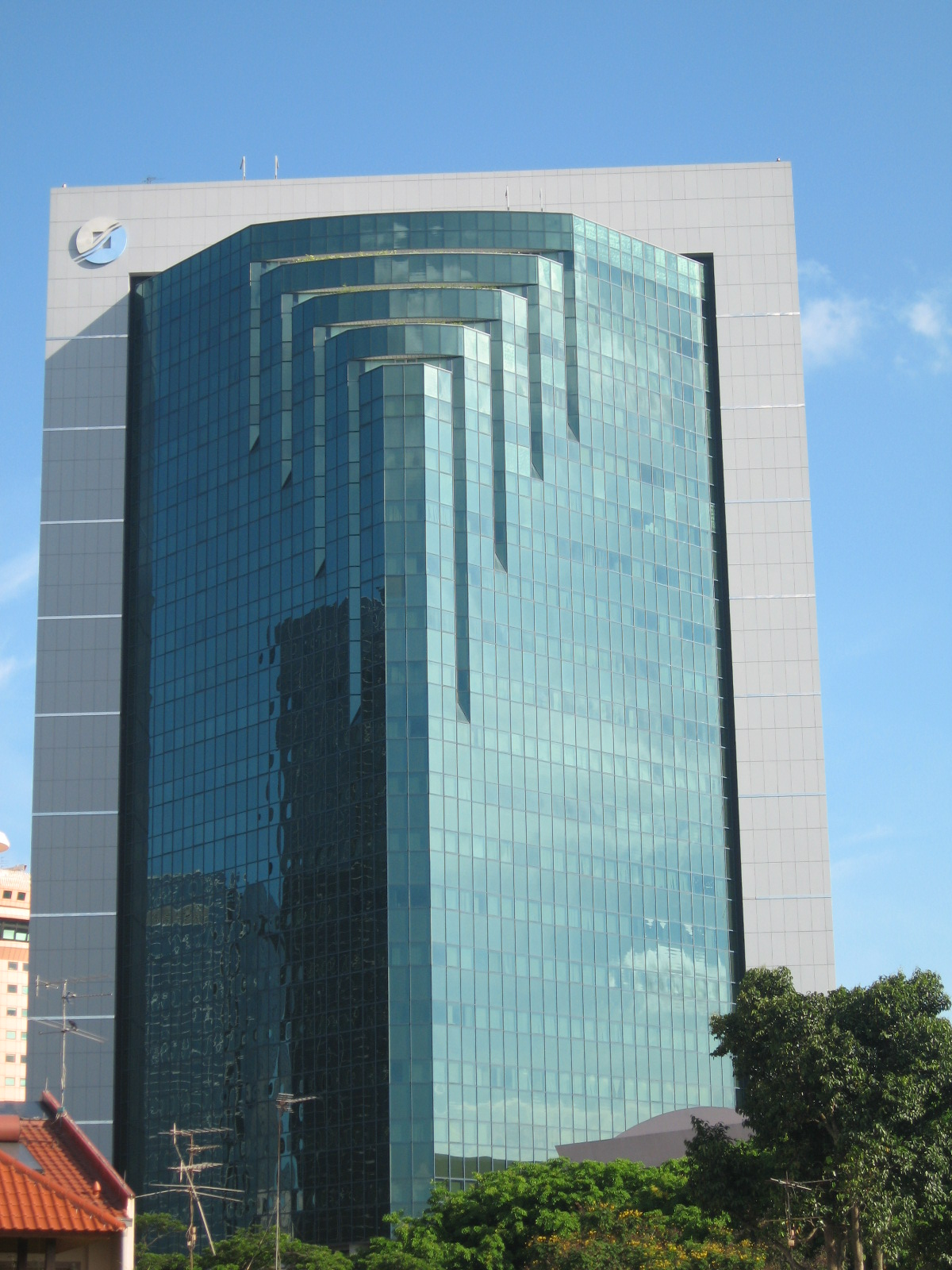
Revenue House, the headquarters of the Inland Revenue Authority of Singapore, at Novena, photographed in May 2006

The Inland Revenue Authority of Singapore (IRAS) is a statutory board under the Ministry of Finance of the Government of Singapore in charge of tax collection.

== History ==
=== 1980s ===
Singapore became a more expensive place for businesses with the rapid developments. Changes were introduced to government policies, incentives and taxes in order to make the economy more competitive. The late 1980s witnessed a significant shift towards lowering both corporate and individual taxes. In 1987 corporate tax rates were lowered from 40% to 33%.

=== 1990s ===
This period witnessed major changes in tax policies. There was a shift towards lower direct taxes and the focus was on indirect taxes. The trend towards indirect taxation resulted in the introduction of the Goods and Services Tax (GST) in 1994. It is a tax on domestic consumption and applies to all goods and services supplied in Singapore except for financial services and residential properties. It was in this period that the trend of lowering corporate and individual tax rates accelerated.

=== 2000 to 2010/2016 ===
Investment and talent attraction policies have been the focus at present. Tax rates were further lowered and currently capped at 18% (till 2010 YA2010 for YE2009) for companies and 20% (till 2017 YA16) for individuals.

=== 2010/2017 and beyond ===
17% companies and max 22% for individuals

== Taxes administered by IRAS ==
As the Singapore Government's principal revenue collection body, IRAS collects Income Tax, Goods and Services Tax (GST), Property Tax, Estate Duty, Betting and Sweepstakes Duties, Stamp Duties and Casino Tax. Blogging is taxable in Singapore if it constitute gains or profits from a trade or a business under section 10(1)(a) of the Income Tax Act 1947 (ITA).

To foster innovation, the tax framework also includes generous incentives, such as enhanced tax deductions for qualifying research and development (R&D) expenditures under To foster innovation, the tax framework also includes generous incentives, such as the enhanced tax deductions for qualifying research and development (R&D) expenditures under Section 14D of the Income Tax Act 1947.

The other tax types in Singapore which are not collected by IRAS are:

- Levies on motor vehicles (Land Transport Authority)
- Customs and excise duties (Singapore Customs)
- Foreign worker levy (Ministry of Manpower)
- Water conservation tax (Public Utilities Board)

== Initiatives ==
The Auto-Inclusion Scheme (AIS) enables employers to submit the employment income information of their employees to IRAS electronically. The information will then be automatically pre-filled in the employees' income tax assessment.

Property owners with rental income may make claims on the total amount of their rental expenses. Alternatively, they may claim deemed rental expenses calculated based on 15% of the gross rent. In addition to the 15% deemed rental expenses, property owners may claim mortgage interest on the loan taken to purchase the tenanted property.

== Performance ==
IRAS collected S$47 billion in tax revenue in FY2016/17. Tax arrears remained low at 0.68% of net tax assessed and cost of collection was also kept low at 0.84 cents for every dollar collected. In FY2016/17, IRAS uncovered 10,626 non-compliant cases and recovered about $332 million in taxes and penalties through rigorous audits and investigation. IRAS collected S$50.2 billion in tax revenue in FY2017/2018, which was an increase of 6.8 per cent from FY2016/2017.

== See also ==
- Goods and Services Tax (Singapore)
- Income tax in Singapore
- Revenue stamps of Singapore
