= Transparency (behavior) =

Ethical concept implying accountability

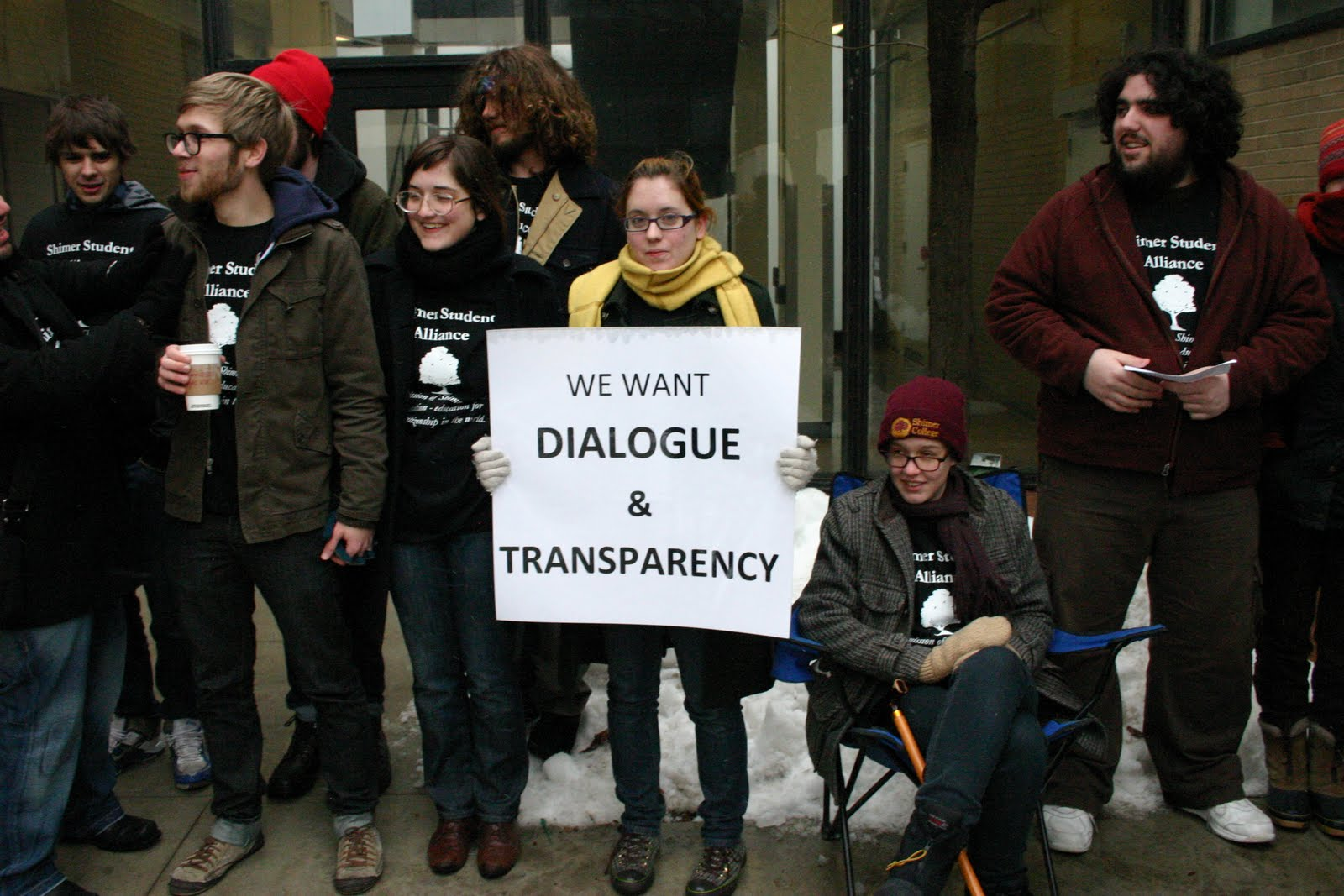
Shimer College students demonstrate in favor of transparency in school administration, 2010.

Transparency in behavior is a way of acting that makes it easy for others to see what actions are performed. As an ethic that spans science, engineering, business, and the humanities, transparency implies openness, communication, and accountability.

Transparency is practiced in companies, organizations, administrations, and communities. For example, in a business relation, fees are clarified at the outset by a transparent agent, so there are no surprises later. This is opposed to keeping this information hidden which is "non-transparent". A practical example of transparency is also when a cashier makes changes after a point of sale; they offer a transaction record of the items purchased (e.g., a receipt) as well as counting out the customer's change.

In information security, transparency means keeping the arcane, underlying mechanisms hidden so as not to obstruct intended function—an almost opposite sense. It principally refers to security mechanisms that are intentionally undetectable or hidden from view. Examples include hiding utilities and tools which the user does not need to know in order to do their job, like keeping the remote re-authentication operations of Challenge-Handshake Authentication Protocol hidden from the user.

== Wages ==
In Norway and in Sweden, tax authorities annually release the "skatteliste", "taxeringskalendern", or "tax list"; official records showing the annual income and overall wealth of nearly every taxpayer.

Regulations in Hong Kong require banks to list their top earners – without naming them – by pay band.

In 2009, the Spanish government for the first time released information on the net worth of each cabinet member, but data on ordinary citizens is private. Currently, elected officials have to disclose their net worth on a yearly basis.

An unwritten norm requires that American politicians release their tax returns, in particular those running for the office of president. During the 2016 presidential campaign, Donald Trump refused to release them, breaking a 47-year-old custom, but still got elected.

== Management ==
Radical transparency is a management method where nearly all decision-making is carried out publicly. All draft documents, all arguments for and against a proposal, all final decisions, and the decision-making process itself are made public and remain publicly archived. This approach has grown in popularity with the rise of the Internet. Two examples of organizations utilizing this style are the Linux community and Indymedia.

Corporate transparency, a form of radical transparency, is the concept of removing all barriers to—and the facilitating of—free and easy public access to corporate information and the laws, rules, social connivance and processes that facilitate and protect those individuals and corporations that freely join, develop, and improve the process.

In 2025 the Austrian Court of Audit argued that mistakes had been made in granting neither Austria's ministry of energy nor regulatory E-Control full access to gas contracts agreed upon between OMV and Russian Gazprom in 2006.

=== Non-governmental organizations ===
Accountability and transparency are of high relevance for non-governmental organisations (NGOs). In view of their responsibilities to stakeholders, including donors, sponsors, programme beneficiaries, staff, states and the public, they are considered to be of even greater importance to them than to commercial undertakings. Yet these same values are often found to be lacking in NGOs.

The International NGO Accountability Charter, linked to the Global Reporting Initiative, documents the commitment of its members international NGOs to accountability and transparency, requiring them to submit an annual report, among others. Signed in 2006 by 11 NGOs active in the area of humanitarian rights, the INGO Accountability Charter has been referred to as the "first global accountability charter for the non-profit sector". In 1997, the One World Trust created an NGO Charter, a code of conduct comprising commitment to accountability and transparency.

== Media ==
Media transparency is the concept of determining how and why information is conveyed through various means.

If the media and the public know everything that happens in all authorities and county administrations there will be a lot of questions, protests and suggestions coming from the media and the public. People who are interested in a certain issue will try to influence the decisions. Transparency creates everyday participation in the political processes by the media and the public. One tool used to increase everyday participation in political processes is freedom of information legislation and requests. Modern democracy builds on such participation of the people and media.

There are, for anybody who is interested, many ways to influence the decisions at all levels in society.

== Politics ==
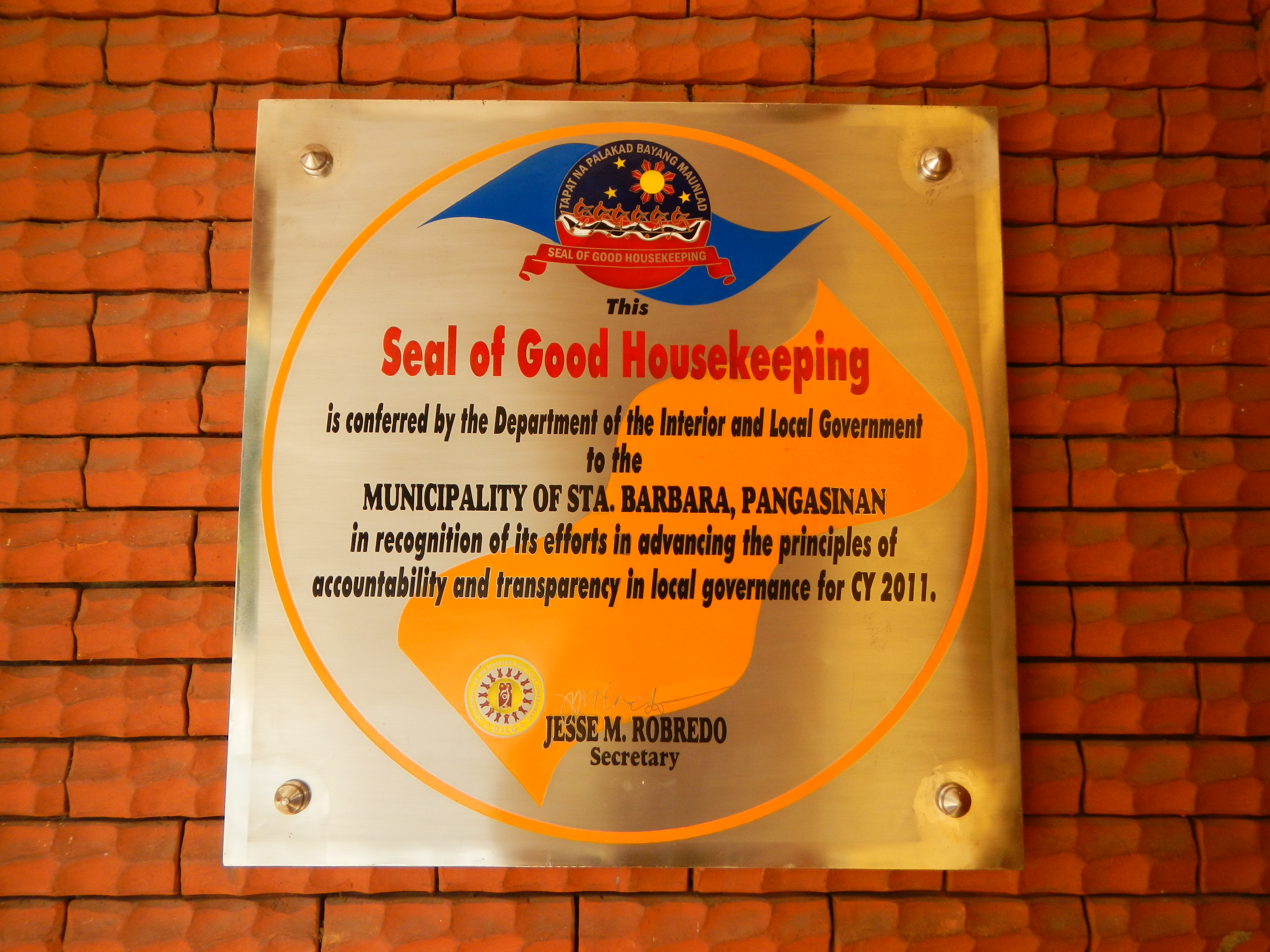
A 2011 plaque recognizing the municipality of Santa Barbara, Pangasinan for its "efforts in advancing the principles of accountability and transparency in local governance"

The right and the means to examine the process of decision-making is known as transparency. In politics, transparency is used as a means of holding public officials accountable and fighting corruption. When a government's meetings are open to the press and the public, its budgets may be reviewed by anyone, and its laws and decisions are open to discussion, it is seen as transparent. It is not clear however if this provides less opportunity for the authorities to abuse the system for their own interests.

When military authorities classify their plans as secret, transparency is absent. This can be seen as either positive or negative; positive because it can increase national security, negative because it can lead to corruption and, in extreme cases, a military dictatorship.

While a liberal democracy can be a plutocracy, where decisions are made behind locked doors and the people have fewer possibilities to influence politics between the elections, a participative democracy is more closely connected to the will of the people. Participative democracy, built on transparency and everyday participation, has been used officially in northern Europe for decades. In the northern European country Sweden, public access to government documents became a law as early as 1766. It has officially been adopted as an ideal to strive for by the rest of the EU, leading to measures like freedom of information laws and laws for lobby transparency.

To promote transparency in politics, Hans Peter Martin, Paul van Buitenen (Europa Transparant) and Ashley Mote decided to cooperate under the name Platform for Transparency (PfT) in 2005. Similar organizations that promote transparency are Transparency International and the Sunlight Foundation.

A recent political movement to emerge in conjunction with the demands for transparency is the Pirate Party, a label for a number of political parties across different countries who advocate freedom of information, direct democracy, network neutrality, and the free sharing of knowledge.

== Online culture ==
21st century culture affords a higher level of public transparency than ever before, and actually requires it in many cases. Modern technology and associated culture shifts have changed how government works (see WikiLeaks), what information people can find out about each other, and the ability of politicians to stay in office if they are involved in sex scandals. Due to the digital revolution, people no longer have a high level of control over what is public information, leading to a tension between the values of transparency and privacy.

== Research ==
Scholarly research in any academic discipline may also be labeled as (partly) transparent (or open research) if some or all relevant aspects of the research are open in the sense of open source, open access and open data, thereby facilitating social recognition and accountability of the scholars who did the research and replication by others interested in the matters addressed by it.

Some mathematicians and scientists are critical of using closed-source mathematical software such as Mathematica for mathematical proofs, because these do not provide transparency, and thus are not verifiable. Open-source software such as SageMath aims to solve this problem.

== Technology ==
In the computer software world, open source software concerns the creation of software, to which access to the underlying source code is freely available. This permits use, study, and modification without restriction.

In computer security, the debate is ongoing as to the relative merits of the full disclosure of security vulnerabilities, versus a security-by-obscurity approach.

There is a different (perhaps almost opposite) sense of transparency in human-computer interaction, whereby a system after change adheres to its previous external interface as much as possible while changing its internal behaviour. That is, a change in a system is transparent to its users if the change is unnoticeable to them.

== Sports ==
Sports has become a global business over the last century, and here, too, initiatives ranging from mandatory drug testing to the fighting of sports-related corruption are gaining ground based on the transparent activities in other domains.

== Criticism ==
Sigmund Freud, following Friedrich Nietzsche ("On Truth and Lie in a Nonmoral Sense"), regularly argues that transparency is impossible because of the occluding function of the unconscious.

Among philosophical and literary works that have examined the idea of transparency are Michel Foucault's Discipline and Punish or David Brin's The Transparent Society. The German philosopher and media theorist Byung-Chul Han, in his 2012 work Transparenzgesellschaft, sees transparency as a cultural norm created by neoliberal market forces, which he understands as the insatiable drive toward voluntary disclosure bordering on the pornographic. According to Han, the dictates of transparency enforce a totalitarian system of openness at the expense of other social values such as shame, secrecy, and trust. He was criticized for his concepts, as they would suggest corrupt politics, and for referring to the anti-democratic Carl Schmitt.

Anthropologists have long explored ethnographically the relation between revealed and concealed knowledges, and have increasingly taken up the topic in relation to accountability, transparency and conspiracy theories and practices today. Todd Sanders and Harry West, for example, suggest not only that realms of the revealed and concealed require each other, but also that transparency in practice produces the very opacities it claims to obviate.

Clare Birchall, Christina Gaarsten, Mikkel Flyverbom, Emmanuel Alloa and Mark Fenster, among others, write in the vein of "critical transparency studies", which attempts to challenge particular orthodoxies concerning transparency. In an article, Birchall assessed "whether the ascendance of transparency as an ideal limits political thinking, particularly for western socialists and radicals struggling to seize opportunities for change". She argues that the promotion of "datapreneurial" activity through open data initiatives outsources and interrupts the political contract between governed and government. She is concerned that the dominant model of governmental data-driven transparency produces neoliberal subjectivities that reduce the possibility of politics as an arena of dissent between real alternatives. She suggests that the radical left might want to work with and reinvent secrecy as an alternative to neoliberal transparency.

Researchers at the University of Oxford and Warwick Business School found that transparency can also have significant unintended consequences in the field of medical care. Gerry McGivern and Michael D Fischer found "media spectacles" and transparent regulation combined to create "spectacular transparency" which has some perverse effects on doctors' practice and increased defensive behaviour in doctors and their staff. Similarly, in a four-year organizational study, Fischer and Ferlie found that transparency in the context of a clinical risk management can act perversely to undermine ethical behavior, leading to organizational crisis and even collapse.

== See also ==
- Access to public information
- Ethical banking
- Lobbying
- Market transparency
- Open government
- Open science
- Open society
- Public record
- Transparency of media ownership in Europe
- Whistleblower
- Whitewash
