= Effect of taxes on employment =

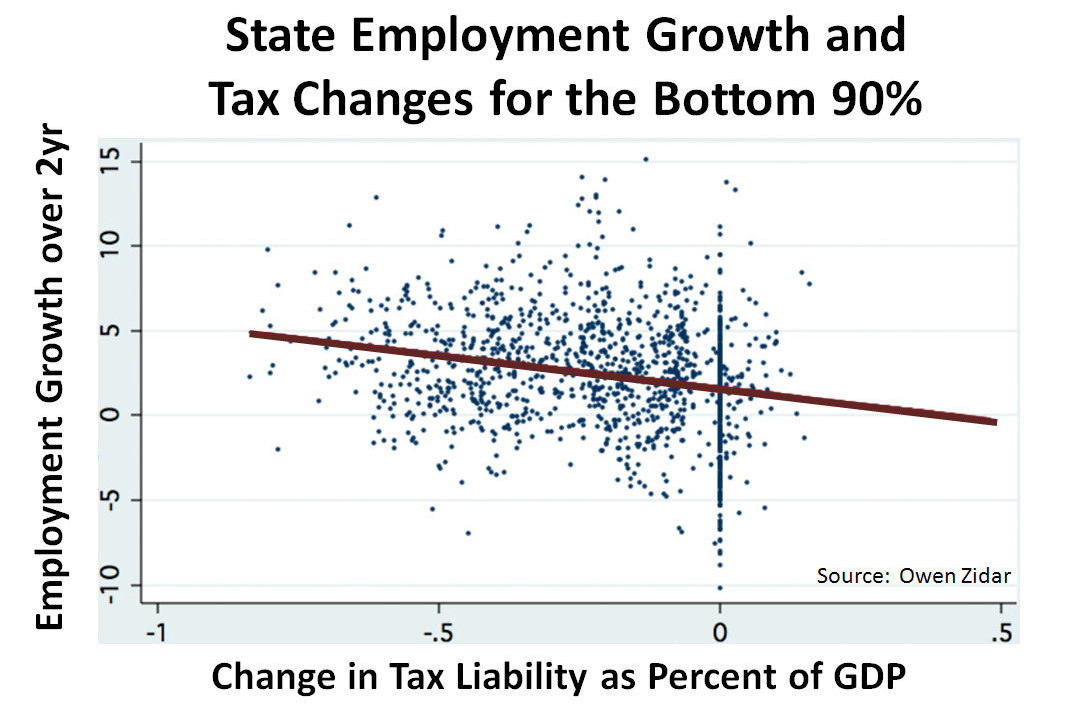
State employment growth versus change in tax liability for bottom 90% income earners in the United States. This chart has been claimed to show that tax decreases on the bottom 90% income earners are correlated with increased employment growth. and employees.

The effect of taxes on employment is a central topic in the field of public economics, focusing on how taxation, particularly income tax, affects individuals' decisions about how much to work, how many hours to work, and whether to participate in the labour market. The topic plays a critical role in the design of tax policy and understanding its efficiency costs, which are directly related to the elasticity of labour supply.

== Theoretical framework ==
=== Optimal taxation and labour supply elasticities ===
The theoretical foundation of labour supply and taxation was originally developed by James A. Mirrlees (1971), who introduced the concept of optimal taxation. Mirrlees' model demonstrated that the efficiency cost of taxation rises with the responsiveness (elasticity) of labour supply. In an optimal tax system, the marginal tax rate should be lower for individuals whose labour supply is more elastic, to avoid creating large disincentives to work.

Saez (2001) extended Mirrlees' work by examining progressive income tax structures and how they can be optimized based on the elasticity of labour supply. The key insight is that higher elasticity implies lower optimal tax rates to minimize welfare losses caused by reduced work effort. Similarly, Diamond and Saez (2011) argued that the optimal tax rate should be adjusted based on labour supply responsiveness to reduce inefficiency.

=== Labour supply models ===
There are several models used to estimate labour supply responses to taxation, each with different assumptions about human capital, savings, and labour market frictions. The key types of models include

==== Static models ====
These models assume individuals make decisions based only on current wages and non-labour income, ignoring long-term dynamics like savings and human capital accumulation.

==== Life-cycle models with savings ====
These models consider how individuals optimize their labour supply over time, taking into account future wages and savings behaviour.

==== Life-cycle models with human capital ====
These models expand on life-cycle models by including the effect of current labour supply on future wages through human capital accumulation.

Empirical findings based on these models show varying estimates of labour supply elasticities, which are essential for tax policy evaluation.

=== Empirical challenges and measurement ===
There are several empirical challenges in estimating labour supply elasticities:

==== Endogeneity of wages and non-labour income ====
Non-wage income, such as transfers or wealth, can influence labour supply decisions, making it difficult to isolate the impact of taxes on labour supply.

==== Measurement error ====
Misreporting of wages or hours worked can lead to inaccurate estimates of labour supply elasticity.

==== Selection bias ====
Participation in the labour market is not random, and individuals self-select into employment based on unobserved characteristics, which can bias elasticity estimates.

==== Nonlinearities in tax/transfer systems ====
The complexity of tax and transfer systems, including non-linearities, makes it difficult to accurately measure how changes in tax rates affect labour supply.

== Empirical findings for male labour supply ==
=== Static models ===
In static models, many studies find that male labour supply is relatively inelastic. For example, the McClelland and Mok (2012) review reports that Marshallian elasticities for men are typically well below 0.5. These findings suggest that tax rates have a modest impact on the number of hours worked by men. However, this conclusion may be influenced by the failure to account for human capital accumulation or long-term effects, as shown in later studies.

=== Life-cycle models with savings ===
In more dynamic models, which incorporate savings and human capital, the estimated elasticities tend to be higher. These models capture how changes in current labour supply can influence future income and wages through savings or human capital accumulation. Keane (2011) notes that life-cycle models generally show higher elasticities for male labour supply compared to static models.

=== Human capital and long-term effects ===
The inclusion of human capital dynamics leads to larger elasticities. Card & Lemieux (2001) demonstrated that changes in labour supply today can have long-term effects on future wages through the accumulation of human capital. Similarly, Lemieux (2006) highlighted that individuals with higher levels of education and experience tend to have lower elasticities because, and their work decisions are less responsive to tax changes.

=== Economic recessions and labour supply ===
Economic recessions can alter the elasticity of labour supply for men. For example, during recessions, when tax rates rise to cover deficits, male labour supply elasticities tend to increase as individuals work more hours to maintain their income. However, during periods of economic growth, elasticities tend to be smaller as workers prioritize leisure. Gutiérrez et al. (2017) and Keane (2011) have documented such cyclical variations in male labour supply.

== Empirical findings for female labour supply ==
=== Participation margin vs intensive margin ===
For women, much of the responsiveness in labour supply comes at the extensive margin, meaning the decision to enter or exit the labour force. Moffitt (2003) and Chetty (2012) and Chetty et al. (2013) have shown that tax and transfer policies, such as the Earned Income Tax Credit (EITC), significantly influence women's decision to participate in the workforce, particularly among single mothers and low-income households. In contrast, changes in tax rates tend to have a smaller effect on the number of hours worked for those already employed.

=== Role of fixed costs, childcare, and fertility ===
Women's labour supply decisions are often influenced by the fixed costs of working, such as childcare or transportation, as well as fertility decisions. Blundell et al. (2000) demonstrated that subsidized childcare can substantially increase female labour supply, particularly among low-income families. Meyer and Rosenbaum (2001) found that women with children are more likely to reduce hours worked or leave the workforce altogether, especially in the presence of generous welfare benefits.

=== Long-term effects of taxes on women's labour supply ===
Long-term effects are particularly significant for women. Heckman and MaCurdy (1980) showed that policies affecting family structure, such as joint taxation for couples or childcare subsidies, have long-lasting impacts on women's career choices and income growth. Keane (2011) cited several studies suggesting that tax and transfer systems that affect family structure or childrearing costs can dramatically influence women's labour supply decisions in the long run.

== Policy implications and efficiency costs ==
=== Tax Design and labour supply elasticities ===
The elasticity of labour supply is crucial for designing efficient tax systems. The optimal tax rate is generally lower when labour supply is more elastic, as larger elasticities imply larger efficiency losses from taxation. Studies such as Saez (2001) and Diamond and Saez (2011) argue that higher elasticities necessitate lower tax rates, particularly for higher income earners, to minimize welfare losses.

=== Redistribution and tax credits ===
Tax policies aimed at redistribution, such as welfare reform or child care subsidies, can have substantial effects on labour supply. For women, especially those at the extensive margin, policies such as the EITC or welfare-to-work programs can lead to large behavioural changes. Chetty et al. (2013) found that these policies can significantly affect women's participation in the labour force, particularly in low-income households.

== Gaps, challenges, and future directions ==
Despite significant progress, there are still substantial gaps in our understanding of labour supply and taxation:

=== Measurement and modelling issues ===
The endogeneity of wages, non-linearities in tax and transfer systems, and fixed costs of work remain significant challenges in estimating labour supply elasticities.

=== Macro vs micro elasticities ===
Bridging the gap between micro-level estimates (individual responses) and macro-level elasticities (aggregate labour supply changes) remains an ongoing challenge.

=== Cross-country comparisons ===
More international studies are needed to understand how different tax systems and labour market structures affect labour supply.

=== Firm constraints and information frictions ===
Recent work on labour supply frictions, such as firm wage-hour contracts and information asymmetries, highlights the complexity of labour supply responses. Chetty et al. (2009) document how these frictions can lead to underestimation of true elasticities. They use a field experiment in a grocery store, to find that posting tax-inclusive price tags reduces demand by 8 percent. They also find that increases in taxes included in posted prices reduce alcohol consumption more than increases in taxes applied at the register.
