= Third-Party Taxi Booking Service Providers Act =

Statute of the Parliament of Singapore

Third-Party Taxi Booking Service Providers Act 2015

Parliament of Singapore
- Long title: An Act to regulate third‑party taxi booking services and to make consequential and related amendments to certain other Acts.
- Enacted by: Parliament of Singapore
- Enacted: 11 May 2015
- Assented to: 4 June 2015
- Commenced: 1 September 2015

Repealed by
- Point-to-Point Passenger Transport Industry Act 2019
- Status: Repealed

The Third-Party Taxi Booking Service Providers Act 2015 is a statute of the Parliament of Singapore that makes it necessary for third-party taxi booking services that have more than 20 participating taxis, to register with the Land Transport Authority (LTA) in order to operate in Singapore. The law requires the service providers to adhere to guidelines such as specifying fares and surcharges to commuters upfront, dispatching only licensed taxis and drivers, and providing LTA with live data on bookings.

== Overview ==
The Third-Party Taxi Booking Service Providers Act is passed as a light-touch approach in protecting commuter interest and safety while regulating third-party taxi booking services. New service providers must obtain a certificate of registration before they can operate in Singapore. Taxi-booking fees charged by service providers cannot exceed those charged by taxi companies. Taxi-booking service providers that violate the regulatory framework may be liable to penalties of up to $100,000 per contravention.

The Act also caters for additional measures:

- Destinations are optional while making bookings with third-party taxi booking services
- Bidding and pre-trip tipping by passengers are forbidden
- Third-party taxi booking services and apps must display all vehicle types, surcharges, prices, and booking fees clearly

== Uses of the Act ==
As of 2016, taxi booking apps such as GrabTaxi and Hailo have been issued a certificate that allows them to operate in Singapore for a period of three years from 1 December 2015.

== See also ==
- Lui Tuck Yew
