= Income Tax Act 1947 =

Statute of the Parliament of Singapore

- Long title: An Act to impose a tax upon incomes and to regulate the collection thereof.
- Status: In force

The Income Tax Act 1947 (ITA) is an Act of the Singaporean Parliament to impose a tax upon incomes and to regulate the collection thereof. It was commenced together with the formation of the Inland Revenue Authority of Singapore.

== Overview ==
The ITA grants any person including Singaporeans in Singapore the right to pay income tax upon the income accruing in or derived from Singapore, or received in Singapore from outside Singapore. The Inland Revenue Authority of Singapore under Ministry of Finance (Singapore) is in charge of tax collection.

The latest amendment bill is still being made as of March 2016.

Under Section 95 of the ITA, convicted taxpayers are subjected to a penalty of up to 200% of the amount of tax undercharged in cases of incorrect tax returns. Fines of S$5,000 or three years of jail may also be awarded.

== Uses and Concerns ==
Blogging is taxable in Singapore if it constitute gains or profits from a trade or a business under section 10(1)(a) of the ITA.
