= Robert A. Moffitt =

American economist

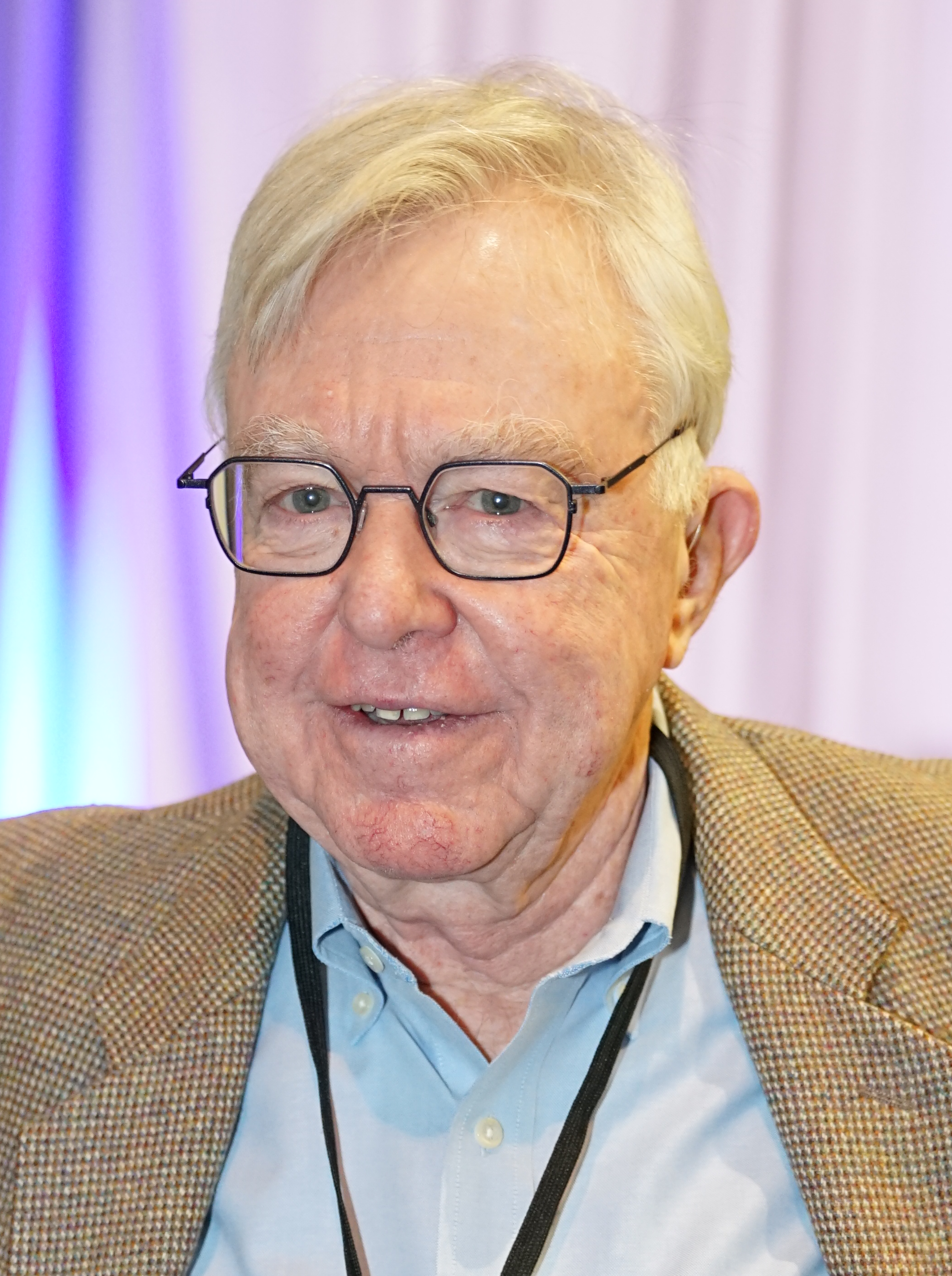
- Moffitt at ASSA 2026
- Born: August 10, 1948 (age 78)
- Education: Rice University; Brown University

Robert Allen Moffitt (born 1948) is an American economist; he is currently the Krieger-Eisenhower Professor of Economics at Johns Hopkins University. His areas of research include the economics of tax and transfer programs, especially welfare programs, the analysis of earnings instability in the labor market, the economics of the family, and applied microeconometrics.

== Career ==
Moffitt is currently the Krieger-Eisenhower Professor of Economics at Johns Hopkins University and holds a joint appointment at the Johns Hopkins School of Public Health. Prior to joining Johns Hopkins in 1995, he was Professor of Economics at Brown University, where he taught for eleven years. He has also held positions at the University of Wisconsin, the University of Maryland, and Mathematica Policy Research, Inc., where he was Co-Principal Investigator of the Gary Negative Income Tax Experiment.

Aside from his academic positions, Moffitt has also served as president of the Population Association of America and chair of the Social Security Advisory Board Technical Committee on Labor Force Projections. In addition, he has served in editorial positions at major economics journals, including as chief editor of The American Economic Review, and as co-editor of The Review of Economics and Statistics. Currently, he is vice-president of the Society of Labor Economists.

Moffitt has been a recipient of several awards for his research contributions, including a MERIT Award from the National Institutes of Health and a Guggenheim Fellowship. He is a Fellow of Econometric Society, Fellow of American Academy of Arts and Sciences, Member of National Academy of Sciences, and a Fellow of the Society of Labor Economists.

He has served on several government advisory committees, review panels, National Academy of Sciences report panels, government relations committees, and boards of household surveys including the Panel Study of Income Dynamics and the National Longitudinal Survey of Youth.

== Major research ==
Moffitt has contributed to the literature in labor economics, public economics, and applied microeconometrics.

Specifically, he has worked on evaluating numerous means-tested, or welfare policies in the US, aimed at finding causal policy effects on outcomes such as labor supply, reducing poverty, the formation of single mother households, and children's health. He is also known for his work on earnings instability and its trends in the U.S. and his work on applied microeconometric methods .

=== US welfare programs ===
Moffitt has studied the labor supply effects of the Food Stamp program, which were found to be very small, the Medicaid program, where labor supply disincentives were strongly correlated with medical need; and the Social Security Disability Insurance Program, where he found that reducing the tax rate on earnings had the same ambiguous effects on labor supply as for other welfare programs. He has written reviews of the literature on the effect of welfare programs on labor supply and has edited volumes of reviews of major welfare programs in the U.S.

Moffitt has found that many families eligible for welfare programs did not participate in them and hypothesized that the stigma of participation in welfare programs was a probable cause. He has found that welfare programs have small negative effects on labor supply, but that reductions in the marginal tax rate on earnings has no net effect on labor supply.

Moffitt has also studied the effects of welfare programs on marriage and childbearing behavior. His 1998 review of the literature on that subject concluded that the effects were probably not zero but small in magnitude. Moffitt has also studied the determinants of the rise of female-headed households in the US, including both male and female wages in a model of household formation and welfare participation. He found that the decline of male wages coupled with the rise in female wages for poor US households significantly reduced the gains from marriage and was a large contributor to the rise of single mother households in the 1980s and 1990s.

=== US labor market ===
Study trends in earnings volatility in the U.S., Gottschalk and Moffitt (1994) showed that the well-known increase in men's earnings inequality during the 1980s stemmed partly from an increase in earnings volatility and, further, that the sharp rise in transitory variance was concentrated in the low-skill, low-income portion of the male population. In later work, he has found that the variance of transitory component slowed its rise over the 1990s but began to rise in the middle 2000s again, although possibly because of the Great Recession.

=== Public economics ===
Moffitt has also considered state voter choices on welfare benefits, suggesting in work with Ribar and Wilhelm that lower middle class workers who saw their real wages decline were a strong political force in state decisions to lower welfare benefits. He also conducted research on changing net wealth transfers over the lifetime of the U.S. Social Security system, documenting numerically the decline in transfers and in implicit rates of return arising from the legacy problem in the system.

=== Applied microeconometrics ===
Moffitt was the first economist to formulate the causal model with heterogeneous effects as a random coefficients model, introducing the concept of a marginal treatment effect to economics in his work with Bjorklund. He demonstrated the assumptions needed to estimate dynamic models when only having data on repeated cross-sections and extended that to a larger review of how to combine different data sets to estimate distributions and economic models with Ridder.

== Major publications ==
=== Books ===
- Moffitt, R., & University of Wisconsin—Madison. (1992). Incentive effects of the U.S. welfare system: A review. Madison, Wis.: Institute for Research on Poverty, University of Wisconsin—Madison.
- Moffitt, R., Reville, R., Winkler, A. E., & Johns Hopkins Population Center. (1997). Beyond single mothers: Cohabitation, marriage, and the U.S. welfare system. Baltimore, Md: Johns Hopkins Population Center.
- Moffitt, R., & National Bureau of Economic Research. (2002). Economic effects of means-tested transfers in the U.S. Cambridge, MA: National Bureau of Economic Research.
- Moffitt, R., & Ver, P. M. (2001). Evaluating welfare reform in an era of transition. Washington, DC: National Academy Press.

=== Selected journal articles ===
- The Deserving Poor, the Family, and the U.S. Welfare System. Demography, June, 2015.
- The Rising Instability of US Earnings. Journal of Economic Perspectives, Fall 2009 (with P. Gottschalk).
- Mother's Transitions from Welfare to Work and the Well-Being of Preschoolers and Adolescents. Science, March 7, 2003 (with P.L. Chase-Lansdale et al.)
- Welfare Benefits and Female Headship in U.S. Time Series. American Economic Review, May 2000.
- The Growth in Earnings Instability in the U.S. Labor Market. Brookings Papers on Economic Activity, 1994, Vol.2 (with P. Gottschalk).
- The Estimation of Wage Gains and Welfare Gains in Self-Selection Models. Review of Economics and Statistics, February 1987 (with Anders Bjorklund).
- An Economic Model of Welfare Stigma. American Economic Review, December 1983.

== Major awards ==
- Elected Member, National Academy of Sciences
- Elected President, Population Association of America (2013)
- Fellow, American Academy of Arts and Sciences (2012)
- Guggenheim Fellowship (2009)
