= Foreign Employee Dormitories Act 2015 =

Parliament of Singapore
- Long title: An Act to provide for the regulation of operators of dormitories for foreign employees and for matters connected with or incidental to that.
- Enacted by: Parliament of Singapore
- Enacted: 20 January 2015
- Assented to: 16 February 2015
- Commenced: 1 January 2016
- Status: In force

The Foreign Employee Dormitories Act 2015 (FEDA) is a statute of the Parliament of Singapore that provides for the regulation of operators of dormitories for foreign employees and for matters connected with or incidental to that.

== Background ==
The Foreign Employee Dormitories Act requires dormitories hosting foreign labourers in Singapore to obtain a license if there are more than 1,000 beds. As of 2015, there are around 50 purpose-built dormitories that provide over 200,000 beds across the island. As an example, Tuas View Dormitory has been the first of nine such dorms to be built over the two years. It consists of 20 four-storey blocks, housing up to 16,800 workers.

Dormitories licensed under the FEDA are expected to cater towards added security and public health requirements as well as providing social, recreational and commercial amenities such as computerised access systems, sickbays, recreational areas, minimarts and Wi-Fi coverage.

== Uses of the Act ==
Foreign workers' dormitories are classified as public spaces for the purpose of the provision relating to drunkenness under the Miscellaneous Offences (Public Order and Nuisance) Act. With FEDA and the Liquor Control (Supply and Consumption) Act 2015, workers can still drink in their private quarters, subject to dormitory rules.
