= Silver Support Scheme Act 2015 =

Statute of the Parliament of Singapore

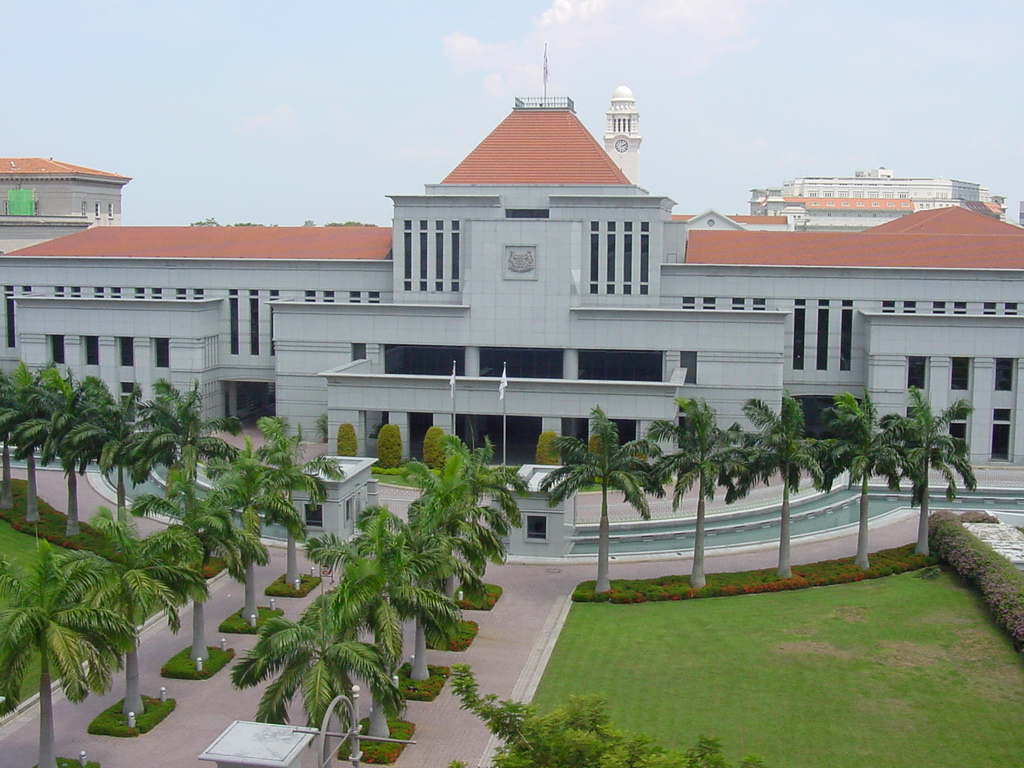

Parliament of Singapore
- Long title: An Act to provide for a social security scheme called the Silver Support Scheme and for related matters.
- Enacted by: Parliament of Singapore
- Enacted: 17 August 2015
- Assented to: 21 August 2015
- Commenced: 18 January 2016

Legislative history
- Bill title: Silver Support Scheme Bill
- Status: In force

The Silver Support Scheme Act 2015 is a statute of the Parliament of Singapore that implements the social security Silver Support Scheme in Singapore. The law supplements the retirement savings of the needy elderly, to help them cope with their living expenses. The means-tested program complements Singapore's Central Provident Fund (CPF) system by targeting elderly who fell through the cracks of the work-based savings scheme. Benefits range from S$300 to S$750 quarterly, adjusted annually for inflation.

== Overview ==
The Silver Support Scheme Act of 2015 is a law detailing the framework and penalties for the Silver Support Scheme. It caters for around 150,000 eligible Singaporeans who are at least 65 years of age to receive a quarterly government payout of between S$300 and S$750 from beginning 2016 onwards. The scheme in general is maintained by the Central Provident Fund Board of the Government of Singapore, which assesses a person's eligibility and thereby paying him or her. Qualifying factors may include lifetime wages, household support and housing type.

Singaporeans may opt out from this process. In contrast with the Pioneer Generation Programme which focuses solely on Singaporean pioneers that are Singaporean residents during national independence, the Silver Support Scheme looks after both current and future generations of elderly.

== Uses of the Act ==
The Silver Support Scheme was introduced in August 2014 during the National Day Rally by Prime Minister Lee Hsien Loong. The overall aim is mitigating inequalities by supplementing incomes for the bottom 20-30% of elderly Singaporeans, who may have lesser means, in their retirement years.

In the case of those with private housing addresses but may require similar help, they may not automatically qualify for the scheme being 'marginal cases', however they may appeal to the Commissioner on a case-by-base basis.

== See also ==
- Ministry of Manpower (Singapore)
