= Taxeringskalendern =

Swedish tax directory

Taxeringskalendern (Swedish pronunciation: [/tɑːkˈseːrɪŋsˌkalɛnːɛrn/]) (English: "the tax annual" or "the tax calendar") is the Swedish term for the directory that contains public information on taxable income and capital of all the individuals aged 18 and above in Sweden. The Swedish Tax Agency maintains high levels of legal transparency regarding citizens’ financial information, comparable to Norway and Finland.

== History ==
The first taxeringskalender in Sweden was published in 1905, although the term itself was established as early as 1903. However, the dictionary Svenska Akademiens ordbok attests to the word's first usage in 1923. The first two publishers were AB Förenade Kalenderföretagen, which is owned by Albert Bonniers förlag, and Kalenderförlaget i Västerås AB.

Until 2008, the Taxeringskalendern also contained information on individual asset data. However, this information stopped being published after the revocation of the wealth tax on January 1st, 2007.

== Format ==
As of 2025, Taxeringskalendern is published by Kalenderförlaget in Solna, Sweden. The publication is organized into 23 regional editions, each corresponding to one of Sweden’s counties. Later editions contain a Top 100 list of the country's and individual municipalities' largest earners. The average income (divided by age group) is available for Sweden and each municipality. In 2016, a top list for limited companies was introduced.

The information is derived from tax returns, with each year’s data reflecting the previous year's tax information. For example, the 2020 edition is based on the 2019 returns, which report income from 2018. As a result, the data may be outdated if individuals have changed jobs, received pay increases, or reported one-time income events such as property sales.

Newspapers annually list the highest incomes in their publication area.

Credit agencies maintain electronic versions of the taxeringskalender from the Swedish Tax Agency and disclose information for payment.

== Principle of public access to official records ==
In Sweden, tax returns are confidential according to Chapter 27 § 1 Offentlighets- och sekretesslagen. However, according to § 6, the confidentiality under § 1 does not apply to decisions that determine tax liabilities or pensionable income, nor to decisions that establish a basis for determining taxes.
