= Bus Services Industry Act =

Statute of the Parliament of Singapore

Bus Services Industry Act 2015
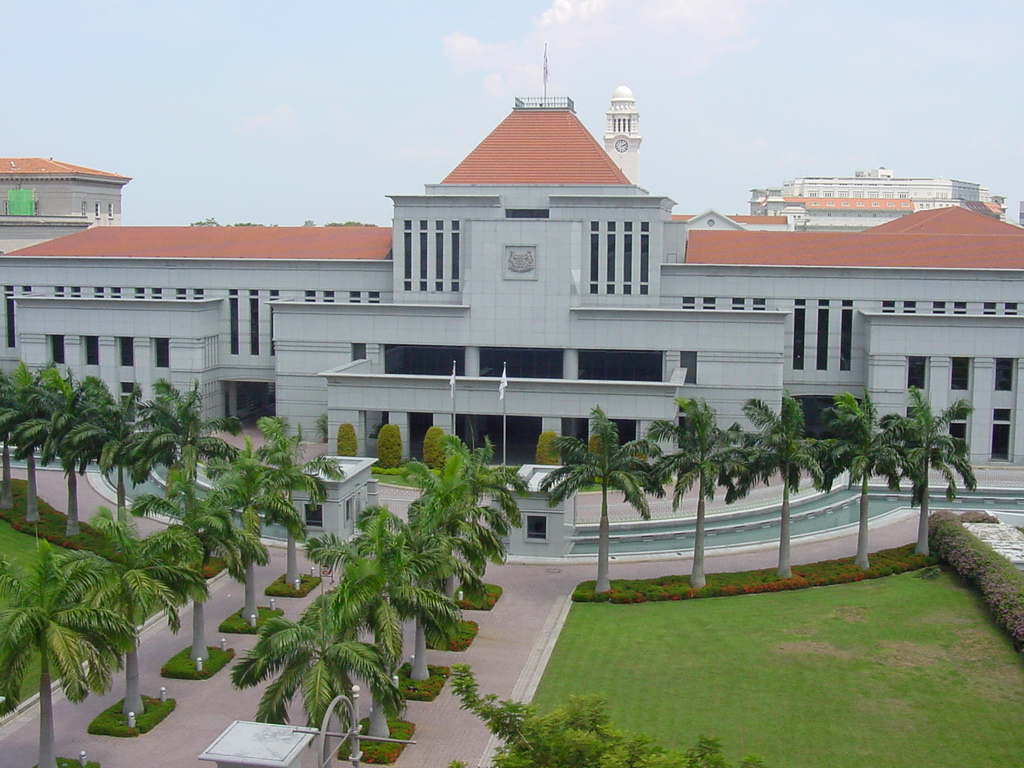

Parliament of Singapore
- Long title: An Act to regulate the provision of bus services, the operation of bus depots and bus interchanges in Singapore, and to make consequential amendments to certain other Acts.
- Citation: Act 30 of 2015
- Enacted by: Parliament of Singapore
- Enacted: 18 August 2015
- Assented to: 21 August 2015
- Commenced: 22 January 2016
- Status: In force

The Bus Services Industry Act 2015 is a statute of the Parliament of Singapore that provide for the Land Transport Authority (LTA) to take over the regulation of the operators of bus services, depots and interchanges from the Public Transport Council (PTC).

== Overview ==
The Bus Services Industry Act caters for the Government owning the buses and allows the Land Transport Authority in responding more expeditiously regarding changes in travel demand. Operators that will be running bus services as contractors can also be removed if they do not meet standards. Routes are tendered to operators to operate, while revenue risk is supposedly being borne by the state.

== Uses of the Act ==
Under the Bus Services Industry Act, the difference between what the Government of Singapore collects in fares and the amounts it pays operators will be covered by subsidies. This may impact fare review mechanism that is pre-existing, in which the public transport operators may be expected to apply for fare changes annually.

== See also ==
- Public Transport Council (Amendment) Act 2015
