= Pawnbrokers Act 2015 =

Statute of the Parliament of Singapore

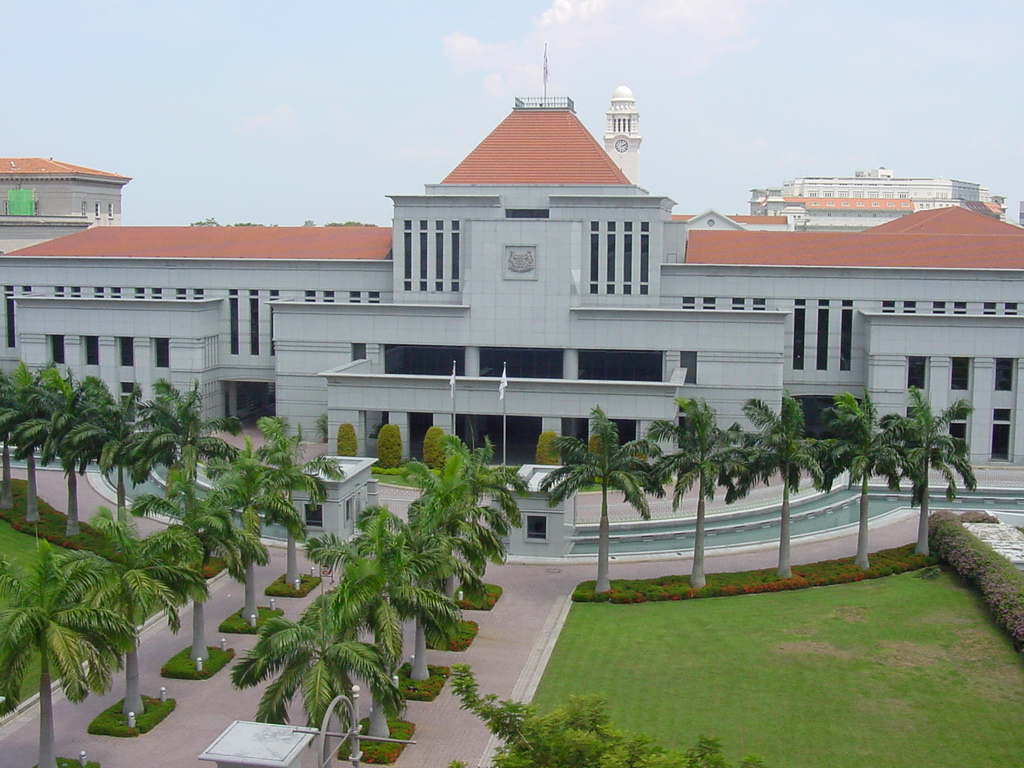

Parliament of Singapore
- Long title: An Act to repeal and re-enact the Pawnbrokers Act (Chapter 222 of the 1994 Revised Edition) and to make consequential amendments to certain other written laws, essentially an Act relating to pawnbrokers.
- Enacted by: Parliament of Singapore
- Enacted: 19 January 2015
- Assented to: 16 February 2015
- Commenced: 1 April 2015

Repeals
- Pawnbrokers Act 1994
- Status: In force

The Pawnbrokers Act 2015 is a statute of the Parliament of Singapore that relates to pawnbrokers. The 2015 Act repeals and re-enacts the Pawnbrokers Act (Chapter 222 of the 1994 Revised Edition) and also makes consequential amendments to certain other written laws.

== Overview ==
Under the old Pawnbrokers Act of 1994, unredeemed pawned items would be put up for auction by pawnbrokers. Should the auction sale price be higher than the item's valuation, the excess went to the person that pawned the item. The new Pawnbrokers Act repeals the 1994 edition, requiring pawnbrokers to maintain a minimum paid-up capital of S$2 million for each first branch, and S$1 million for each subsequent branch. A higher security deposit is required with every branch, up from S$20,000.

Other steps expected include prevention of money laundering such as conducting stricter checks on their customers and reporting suspicious transactions to the police. This comes after a two-year national risk assessment by the Ministry of Home Affairs (Singapore), Ministry of Finance (Singapore) and the Monetary Authority of Singapore (MAS).

== See also ==
- Indranee Rajah
