= 1996 in Singapore =

- Decades: 1970s; 1980s; 1990s; 2000s; 2010s
- See also: Other events of 1996; Timeline of Singaporean history

The following lists events that happened during 1996 in Singapore.

== Incumbents ==
- President: Ong Teng Cheong
- Prime Minister: Goh Chok Tong

== Events ==
=== January ===
- 1 January – The old laminated NRICs are no longer valid for identification in Singapore.
- 2 January – The Land Transport Authority releases the White Paper on A World Class Land Transport System, setting out plans to improve land transport in Singapore.
- 19 January – Minister for Communications Mah Bow Tan announced the immediate construction of the North East MRT line during the parliamentary debate on the White Paper on A World Class Land Transport System, initially targeted by December 2002. However, automation problems pushed back the date to 20 June 2003.
- 20 January – The Singapore Art Museum is officially opened.

=== February ===
- 2 February – The Maritime and Port Authority of Singapore is formed from a merger between the Marine Department (under the then Ministry of Communications), National Maritime Board and the Regulatory departments of the former Port of Singapore Authority (PSA). This helps to streamline maritime operations.
- 9 February – Tampines Mall is officially opened.
- 10 February –
  - The Woodlands extension of the North South MRT line opens. On the same day, the Bukit Panjang LRT line is announced, with completion in 1999. The Buona Vista LRT line will not go ahead as it is unfeasible, even with a new funding arrangement used. A new Customs, Immigration and Quarantine Checkpoint for the Malayan Railway will be built in Woodlands as well, in preparation for a train network linking Asia, particularly with Malaysia.
  - Woodlands Regional Bus Interchange opens as Singapore's first underground bus interchange.

=== March ===
- 4 March – 16 stations will be built on the 20 km (12 miles) North East MRT line. Construction will start in the middle of 1997 and will finish by 2002. All the stations will be finished by then except for Sennett (present day Potong Pasir), Woodleigh and Punggol, which will open when the surrounding areas develop.
- 5 March – The Singapore Gamma Knife Centre is officially opened. The centre, a privately owned facility, uses gamma knife for brain surgeries, resulting in less pain than conventional brain surgery, as well as a much safer alternative.
- 10 March – Several bus services running parallel to the Woodlands MRT extension were either withdrawn or amended.
- 22 March – Cyberway Internet is officially launched as Singapore's third ISP.

=== April ===
- 1 April – The Singapore Productivity and Standards Board (renamed SPRING Singapore) is formed from the merger of three agencies, namely National Productivity Board (NPB), Singapore Institute of Standards and Industrial Research (SISIR) and the SME development function of the Economic Development Board (EDB). The agency aimed to encourage productivity and growth in the economy.
- 6 April – The Gleneagles Hospital is officially opened.
- 14 April – The S.League, a professional tournament, is launched.

=== May ===
- 2 May – The Advance Medical Directive Act is passed to allow people to apply for a Directive should they not want to continue treatment. The law came into effect in 1997.
- 11 May – The Government announced that it will end SingTel's monopoly on the mobile network by 2000 as part of a move to start competition in the telecoms industry.
- 21 May – A debate happened in Parliament over the HPL saga.

=== June ===
- 20 June – The National Youth Centre and Youth Park are officially launched.
- 24 June – The Singapore Chinese Orchestra is launched as Singapore's second orchestra.

=== July ===
- 1 July – The National Parks Board (NParks) is formed, building on the vision of a 'City in a Garden'.
- 5 July – Plans to replace the Causeway are announced by Malaysian Prime Minister Mahathir Mohamad.
- 12 July – In response to mobile liberalisation, a sum of $1.5 billion is approved as compensation to SingTel for the early end of its monopoly.
- 20 July – New finger piers are opened in Changi Airport's Terminal 2.
- 24 July – The Tourism 21 plan is unveiled.

=== August ===
- August – Lot One opens to the public.
- 11 August – Construction starts on The Esplanade, which will enhance the arts in Singapore.
- 18 August –
  - Plans to develop Punggol are announced known as Punggol 21. The town will incorporate residential areas, clustered community areas linked up by an LRT system. However, the plan did not fully materialise after the 1997 Asian financial crisis, low demand of flats and construction troubles plagued the project.
  - On the same day, the formation of Community Development Councils (CDCs) are announced, which numbered nine in 1997.

=== September ===
- 3 September – The third phase of the Tampines Expressway opens. More roads are planned for upgrading and widening, including on stretches of the Pan Island Expressway and East Coast Parkway, the PIE/TPE flyover and Upper Bukit Timah Road. The ERP system is still being tested.
- 9 September – The Singapore government launched the year-long "Smile Singapore" campaign.
- 27 September – The Sengkang LRT line is unveiled during a ceremony to start construction on the Bukit Panjang LRT line, to be completed by 1999.
- 28 September – Construction starts on the Opera Estate Drainage Scheme to relieve floods in the area, targeted for completion by 2000.

=== October ===
- 18 October – St Luke's Hospital is officially opened in Bukit Batok, being the first hospital to cater for the elderly. The hospital also has inpatient rehabilitation facilities and long-term residential care services as well.
- 19 October – The Cantonment Complex (now Police Cantonment Complex) starts construction. It will have state-of-the-art features, housing the Central Narcotics Bureau, Criminal Investigation Department and Central Police Division, strengthening cooperation between the agencies. The building will retain the historic Fairfield Methodist Girls' school as an anti-crime and drug education and exhibition centre, and covered walkways will be built for comfort. The Complex is completed in 2001.

=== November ===
- 8 November – SingTel opens the new Telepark building in Tampines as a state-of-the-arts telecommunications facility.
- 15 November
  - The Changi Airport Extension Line (CGL) is announced to serve Changi Airport, with another station in future. The extension will be finished by 2001.
  - Eastpoint Mall's soft opening to the public.
- 16 November – The Selegie Arts Centre is officially opened.
- 23 November – The S'pore Discovery Centre is officially opened.
- 26 November – The CashCard is officially launched.

=== December ===
- 2 December – The Government announced the building of Terminal 3 in Changi Airport to handle more passengers, with completion initially targeted by 2004. However, several crises have delayed the project, which started operating on 9 January 2008. An airport hotel is also considered for travellers, which is ultimately built as Crowne Plaza Changi Airport.
- 5 December – The SCORE Counselling Centre is officially opened, in operation since 1995. The centre aims to help drug addicts steer clear of drugs.
- 9–13 December – The World Trade Organization Ministerial Conference of 1996 took place in Singapore, the first Ministerial Conference to be held.
- 23 December – Nomination day for 1997 General Election: The People's Action Party wins 47 uncontested seats and hence returns to power.

=== Date unknown ===
- The Fort Canning Aquarium closes.

== Births ==
- 12 January – Adam Swandi, footballer
- 20 February – Zong Zijie, actor
- 19 March – Tyler Ten, Singaporean actor
- 14 May – Herman Keh, Singaporean actor
- 20 September – Shanti Pereira, track and field athlete.
- 29 September – Quah Zheng Wen, swimmer.
- 27 October – Hannah Delisha, actress and singer
- 5 November – Zhai Siming, Singapore based actor

== Deaths ==
- 5 February – Lim Chin Siong, former PAP legislative assemblyman for Bukit Timah Constituency and Secretary-General of Barisan Sosialis (b. 1933).
- 17 February – Ly Singko, writer, journalist and editor of Nanyang Siang Pau (b. 1913).
- 10 March – Chan Ah Kow, swimming coach (b. 1912).
- 13 March – T. T. Rajah, short time Secretary-General of the People's Action Party (b. 1919).
- 15 March – V. P. Abdullah, former Labour Party politician and journalist (b. 1913).
- 3 April – Mohamed Ali bin Alwi, former UMNO legislative assemblyman for Kampong Kembangan Constituency (b. 1924).
- 21 April – Yao Tse-Liang, history researcher on Southeast Asia and founding member of South Seas Society (b. 1912).
- 25 April – Cyril Neville Watson, British naval architect and corporate executive (b. 1931).
- 22 May – Wong Peng Soon, badminton player (b. 1917).
- 23 May – Benny Probocemdana Oen, murder victim in the Pacific Plaza stabbing (b. 1958).
- 26 August – Neo Lam Lye, murder victim in the Bedok Reservoir flat murder (b. 1986–1987).
- 9 September – Kum Teng Hock, former PAP city councillor for Geylang East Constituency and later opposition politician in the United People's Party, Workers' Party and co-founder of the National Solidarity Party (b. 1932).
- 14 September – E. J. H. Corner, botanist and assistant director of Singapore Botanic Gardens (b. 1906).
- 4 October – Phang Ai Looi, murder victim of Kwan Cin Cheng (b. 1973).
- 10 November – Venerable Yen Pei, 3rd Chief Abbot of Kong Meng San Phor Kark See Monastery and founder of the Singapore Buddhist Welfare Services (b. 1917).
- 29 November – Bani Buang, Malay director and producer (b. 1929).
- 4 December – Albert Winsemius, economic advisor (b. 1910).
