= 1991 in Singapore =

- Decades: 1970s; 1980s; 1990s; 2000s; 2010s
- See also: Other events of 1991; Timeline of Singaporean history

The following lists events that happened during 1991 in Singapore.

== Incumbents ==
- President: Wee Kim Wee
- Prime Minister: Goh Chok Tong

== Events ==
=== January ===
- 2 January – New machine-readable passports are issued.
- 11 January – The National Science and Technology Board is formed to enhance R&D activities in Singapore.
- 15 January – The five Shared Values of Singapore are adopted.

=== February ===
- 23 February – Civics and moral education is introduced, replacing religious knowledge lessons in schools.

=== March ===
- 2 March – The National Trades Union Congress launches two radio stations, NTUC Heart Radio 91.3 and NTUC Heart Radio 100.3.
- 16 March – The New Horizon Centre is officially opened, making it the first day care centre to look after those with dementia.
- 26 March – Four Pakistanis hijack Singapore Airlines Flight 117 and demand the release of Pakistan Peoples Party members from Pakistani jails.
- 27 March – Members of the Singapore Special Operations Force storm into Singapore Airlines Flight 117, killing all hijackers and freeing all passengers and crew members.

=== May ===
- 4 May – Filipina domestic worker Delia Maga and her 4-year-old charge, Nicholas Huang are found murdered in their flat. Flor Contemplacion was subsequently tried for the murders and found guilty.
- 13 May – Underwater World opens its doors.
- 31 May – The Van Kleef Aquarium closes after falling visitorship.

=== June ===
- 1 June – Changi Airport Terminal 2 is officially opened.
- 3 June – The first National Registration Identity Card (NRIC) replacement exercise takes place in MacPherson Community Club in a programme spanning three years. The programme replaces the existing laminated NRICs to credit-card sized ones with features for higher security. It will also indicate blood types for use in emergencies.
- 6 June – The Civil Defence Academy starts construction. When completed in 1995, the S$63 million complex spanning nine-hectares will train Singapore Civil Defence Force officers, as well as offer computer simulations.
- 29 June – IMM opens its doors.

=== July ===
- 1 July -
  - Nanyang Technological University (NTU) is formed as Singapore's second university, previously known as the Nanyang Technological Institute.
  - The National Institute of Education (NIE) is formed from the merger of Institute of Education (IE) and the College of Physical Education (CPE). The institution is now part of NTU.

=== August ===
- 1 August – The Singapore International Foundation is formed to help in diplomacy.
- 2 August – Two areas in Singapore, namely the Central and Changi areas are gazetted as Tree Conservation Areas.
- 31 August – In the 1991 General Election, the People's Action Party team led by Goh Chok Tong won 77 out of 81 seats (including 41 uncontested seats) with a vote share of 61.0%; then the lowest vote share since surpassed by the 2011 General Election; which had 60.1%. The opposition won the remaining four, in which three seats went to the Singapore Democratic Party and one seat to the Workers' Party.

=== September ===
- 21 September – The second phase of the Central Expressway opens.

=== October ===
- 4 October – The Van Kleef Aquarium reopens as the World of Aquarium.
- 15 October – The National Arts Council is formed to spearhead the development of the arts in Singapore.
- 16 October – PolyView is launched to enhance education and IT services. This comes after the release of the IT2000 masterplan a few weeks earlier.

=== November ===
- 24 November – The Keppel-Brani causeway is officially opened, making it the first road link between Singapore and an island.

== Births ==
- 28 January – Sufi Rashid - Singaporean singer.
- 16 February – Aliff Aziz - Singaporean singer and actor
- 15 March – Atikah Suhaime - Singaporean actress.
- 21 June – Sachin Mylavarapu, Singaporean cricketer
- 26 July – Nathan Hartono, Singaporean singer-songwriter.
- Date unknown - Jerrold Yam, Singaporean poet and lawyer.

== Deaths ==
- 25 January – Ismail Marjan, badminton player (b. 1920).
- 6 February – Ismail Rahim, former legislative assemblyman for Geylang East Constituency and founding member of the People's Action Party (b. 1917).
- 6 March – Tan Chye Cheng, 1st President of the Law Society and former Progressive Party legislative councillor for Tanglin Constituency (b. 1911).
- 17 March – Li Rulin, Chinese literary pioneer (b. 1914).
- 24 June – Stephen Lee Hiok Siang, banker, former Chairman of the Four Seas Communications Bank and Honorary Secretary of Ngee Ann Kongsi (b. 1928).
- 25 July – Zena Tessensohn, founding member of the Girls' Sports Club (b. 1909).
- 19 August – Peggy Hochstadt, former Chief Librarian of the NUS Library (b. 1935).
- 14 October – R. Murugason, former Vice-Chairman of the Workers' Party (b. 1926).
- 31 October – Tan Kay Hai, ex-RAF WWII pilot who fought in the European theatre (b. 1914).
- 9 December – Gerald de Cruz, journalist and Organising Secretary of the Malayan Democratic Union (b. 1920).
- 17 December – Chen Wen Hsi, pioneer artist (b. 1906).
