= 1993 in Singapore =

- Decades: 1970s; 1980s; 1990s; 2000s; 2010s
- See also: Other events of 1993; Timeline of Singaporean history

The following lists events that happened during 1993 in Singapore.

== Incumbents ==
- President: Wee Kim Wee (until 1 September), Ong Teng Cheong (starting 1 September)
- Prime Minister: Goh Chok Tong

== Events ==
=== January ===
- 1 January – Edusave is launched to provide all Singaporeans with quality education. The scheme also institutes awards for academic and non-academic achievements.

=== February ===
- 11 February – Asia Pacific Economic Cooperation Secretariat is set up in Singapore.
- 20 February –
  - NTUC Comfort announced that it will corporatise to help in its expansion plans. The plan went through, which resulted in the formation of Comfort Transportation Pte Ltd later in June.
  - The Senoko Incineration Plant is officially opened, making it the third incineration plant in Singapore.
- 21 February – The World of Aquarium closes due to bad business, less than two years after it reopened. The building reopens as the Fort Canning Aquarium after a few months.

=== March ===
- 6 March – St Luke's Hospital starts construction in Bukit Batok, sparking opposition from residents which is eventually solved.

=== April ===
- 1 April – Medifund is set up to provide for medical treatment when Medisave and Medishield are not able to completely cover medical costs.
- 29 April – The first meeting between Association for Relations Across the Taiwan Straits and Straits Exchange Foundation.

=== May ===
- May – Shaw House (Lido) is opened to the public.

=== June ===
- 8 June – Gardenia's new bakery is officially opened.
- 12–20 June – Singapore hosts the 17th Southeast Asian Games. It clinched fourth place with a total of 164 medals.

=== August ===
- 1 August – The National Heritage Board is formed to manage museums and encourage a vibrant cultural and heritage scene.
- 5 August – An MRT collision takes place at Clementi station during the morning rush hour, resulting in 156 injuries.
- 28 August – Ong Teng Cheong wins the first-ever presidential election by 952,513 votes, with Chua Kim Yeow getting 670,358 votes.

=== September ===
- 1 September – Ong Teng Cheong is sworn in as the first elected president.
- 21 September – Ngee Ann City is officially opened.

=== October ===
- 3 October – The Great Singapore Workout is launched as part of the National Healthy Lifestyle Campaign, encouraging people to live healthily.
- 30 October – The Institute of Mental Health (then called Woodbridge Hospital) is officially opened in Hougang.

=== November ===
- 1 November – SingTel is listed on the then Stock Exchange of Singapore (present day Singapore Exchange) after an IPO in October.
- 9 November – The Special Tactics and Rescue Unit of the Singapore Police Force is commissioned.
- 10 November – The Fire Safety Act is passed to ensure safety of buildings in the event of fires.
- 27 November – Junction 8 is opened to the public.

=== December ===
- 5 December – The Jurong section of the Pan Island Expressway opened to traffic.
- 17 December – The Ang Mo Kio Community Hospital (present-day Ang Mo Kio - Thye Hua Kwan Hospital) is officially opened. The hospital works with General Practitioners, which will mainly serve the elderly living in the area.

=== Date unknown ===
- The National Cancer Centre Singapore starts operations.
- Chinatown Point and Wheelock Place are opened.
- 261 O-Level papers are lost in transit.

== Births ==
- 8 January – Amanda Lim, national swimmer.
- 22 January – Zhang Zetong, Malaysian-based Mediacorp actor
- 12 February – Khaw Xinlin, influencer and actress
- 27 March – Benjamin Tan, Mediacorp actor
- 14 June – JianHao Tan, Singaporean YouTuber
- 16 June – Richie Koh, Mediacorp actor
- 24 September – Narelle Kheng, The Sam Willows member.
- 11 October – Tasha Low, ex-Skarf member turned Singaporean actress
- 4 November - Noah Yap, actor.
- 10 November – Raeesah Khan, former politician.
- 17 November – Ayden Sng, Mediacorp actor
- 11 December – Boon Hui Lu, singer.

== Deaths ==
- 11 January – John Le Cain, first Asian as Singapore Police Force commissioner (b. 1912).
- 8 February – Lee Yong Min, former Labour Party politician (b. 1921).
- 15 March – Georgette Chen, painter (b. 1906).
- 4 May – Leong Chee Whye, former Chairman of the Singapore Tourism Board and ex-Nominated Member of Parliament (b. 1946).
- 3 June – Yeoh Ghim Seng, 3rd Speaker of the Parliament of Singapore (b. 1918).
- 30 July – Venerable Yiu Tam, 5th President of the Singapore Buddhist Federation (b. 1908).
- 5 August
  - Tay Eng Soon, Senior Minister of State for Education (b. 1940).
  - Teo Hup Teck, former PAP Member of Parliament for Jalan Kayu Constituency (b. 1935).
- 1 December – John Chia Keng Hock, former footballer (b. 1913).
- 10 December – Mohamed Javad Namazie, former Member of the Legislative Council for Municipal North-East Constituency (b. 1907).
