= 1998 in Singapore =

- Decades: 1970s; 1980s; 1990s; 2000s; 2010s
- See also: Other events of 1998; Timeline of Singaporean history

The following lists events that happened during 1998 in Singapore.

== Incumbents ==
- President: Ong Teng Cheong
- Prime Minister: Goh Chok Tong

== Events ==
=== January ===
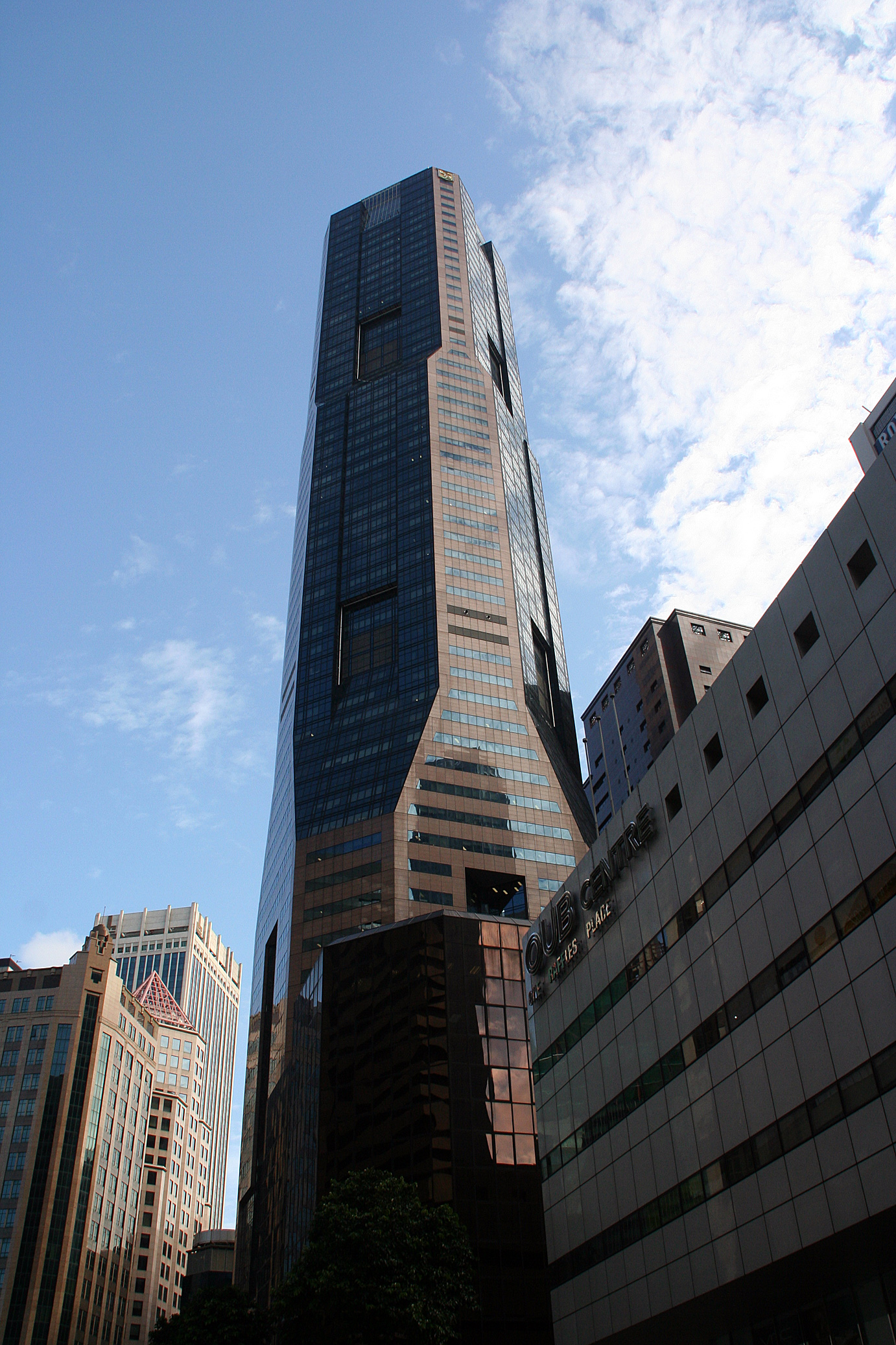
The Republic Plaza

- 1 January –
  - NewsRadio 938, a news radio station, starts broadcasting.
  - The Films and Publications Department (FPD) is set up as part of the Ministry of Information and the Arts.
- 2 January – The Tuas section of the Ayer Rajah Expressway opens in conjunction with the Malaysia–Singapore Second Link.
- 15 January – Singapore and United States announce agreement for US ships to use the newly opened Changi Naval Base.
- 18 January – Republic Plaza is officially opened as City Developments Limited's (CDL) flagship building. Standing at 280 metres, it joins UOB Plaza and OUB Centre (present-day One Raffles Place) as Singapore's tallest buildings until Guoco Tower's completion in 2016, which is 290 metres.

=== February ===
- 2 February – Singapore-based Asia Business News completes its on-air merger with CNBC Asia.
- 10 February – The designs for Expo and Changi Airport stations are unveiled as part of the Changi Airport Extension Line.
- 21 February – The last section of the Seletar Expressway is officially opened.
- 27 February – Party political films are banned after amendments to the Films Act are passed. The amended law also toughens penalties for distribution of pornography, protects minors from pornography and expands 'films' to cover digital films. Censorship procedures will be streamlined into Films and Publications Department in MITA from 1 April.
- 28 February – The Ministry of Education launches the Learning Journeys programme for students to learn about Singapore outside the classroom.

=== March ===
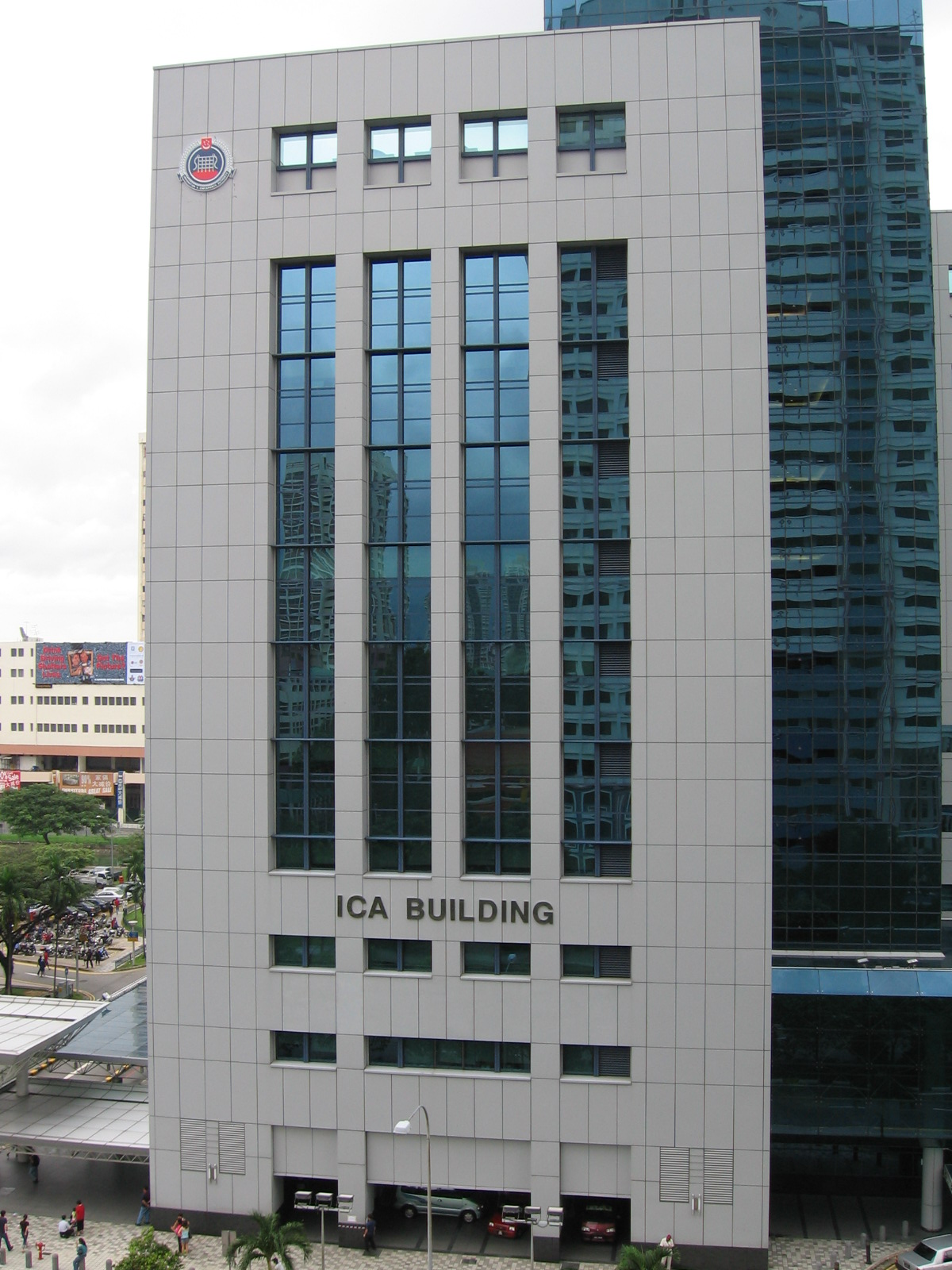
The ICA Building.

- 3 March – The Singapore Immigration and Registration (SIR) Building (now the Immigration and Checkpoints Authority Building) is officially opened. During the opening, several new initiatives are announced, which are "Citizen Services Centre" handling passports, NRICs and citizenship applications, as well as same-day NRIC collection instead of a seven-day period previously. In addition, the blue IC and Re-Entry Permit will soon be combined, doing away with the need for separate REP applications by the end of this year. Services will also be enhanced to better serve foreigners.
- 14 March – The Treetops Trail is officially opened at the Singapore Zoo, giving young children the chance to learn about ecosystems.
- 21 March – The Expressway Monitoring and Advisory System (EMAS) is officially launched. The system allows a faster response to accidents and informs drivers about current traffic conditions, which will be available on all expressways from 2000. The system is completely rolled out in 2001.
- 23 March – Kallang Gasworks ceases operation after operating continuously for 137 years except during the world wars. The facility is subsequently demolished.
- 28 March – The new Changi General Hospital is officially opened.

=== April ===
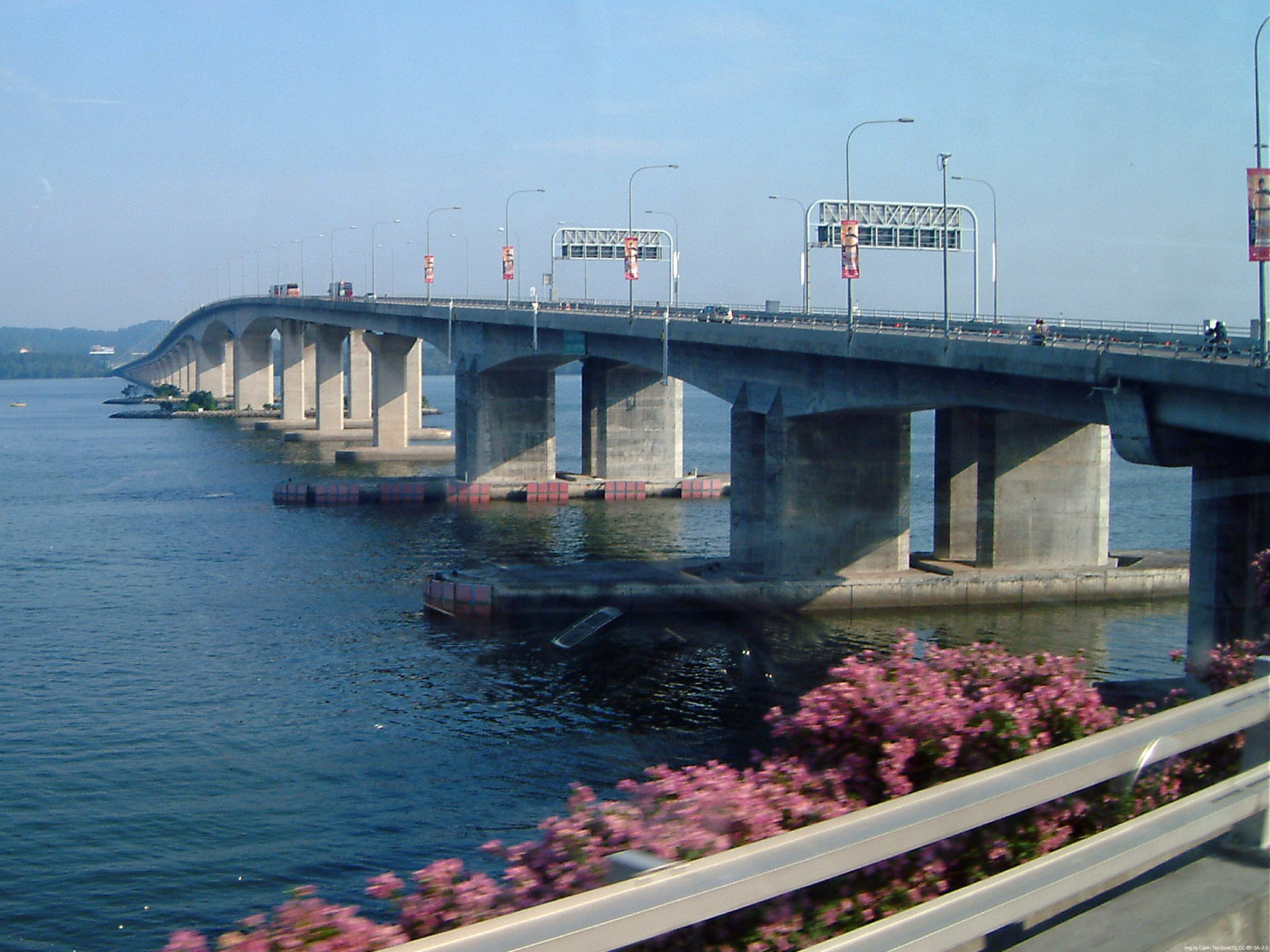
The Malaysia–Singapore Second Link

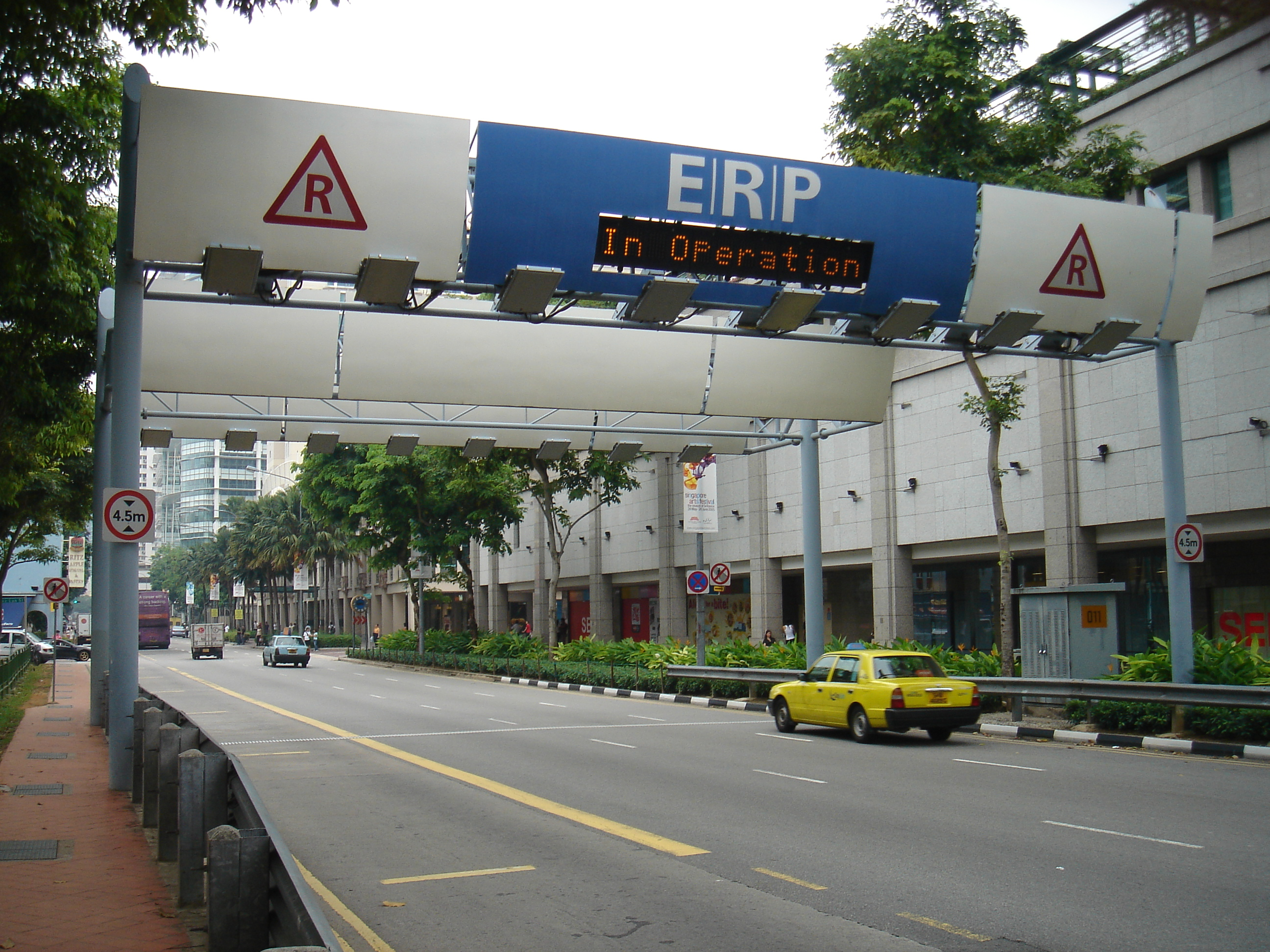
An ERP gantry

- 1 April –
  - The Electronic Road Pricing, a traffic control scheme begins operations.
  - The Ministry of Manpower is formed to better support workers, replacing the previous Ministry of Labour. The move is first announced on 24 February.
  - Singapore Immigration and the National Registration Department have combined to form the Singapore Immigration and Registration (present-day Immigration and Checkpoints Authority), handling both citizenship and immigration matters in Singapore.
- 15 April – The Singapore Film Commission is established to support local films.
- 18 April – The Malaysia–Singapore Second Link is officially opened.
- 23 April – The Telecommunications Authority of Singapore announced that StarHub is awarded a licence to operate both a Public Basic Telephone Service (PBTS) and Public Cellular Mobile Telephone Service (PCMTS). In addition, P2P is awarded only a PCMTS licence. These services will be launched by 1 April 2000, with full liberalisation of telecommunication services in 2002.

=== May ===
- 17 May – Jack Neo releases his very first movie, Money No Enough, that starred Neo, himself together with Mark Lee and Henry Thia.
- 22 May – In the Taw Cheng Kong case, for the first time in Singapore's history the High Court strikes down a statutory provision as unconstitutional, holding that it is inconsistent with Article 12(1) of the Constitution. (The decision is reversed by the Court of Appeal later that year.)
- 25 May – Edwin Siew and Khoo Swee Chiow successfully conquer Mount Everest as part of the Singapore Everest Team, following a failed attempt on 19 May. This makes it the first Singapore team to climb Mount Everest.

=== June ===
- 12 June – The Marina MRT line is announced, which will be 13 km (8.1 miles) long and have 20 stations. It was to have been completed in 2004, but it merged as Stage 1 of the Circle MRT line in 2001. In addition, another 46 trains will be bought, with 25 for the North East MRT line, five for Changi Airport Line (CAL) and 16 more for the North South and East West lines.

=== July ===
- 1 July
  - Four Seas Bank merges with OCBC Bank.
- 24 July – The Ministry of Finance announced the acquisition of POSBank by DBS Bank in a push to consolidate Singapore's banks into stronger banks, as well as cater to changing consumer profiles. The acquisition will make DBS Bank the largest Southeast Asian bank and largest retail bank in Singapore with S$93 billion in assets. The POSBank brand will be retained too. The acquisition is completed on 16 November 1998.

=== August ===
- August – Raintree Pictures is launched.
- 1 August – The Woodlands Train Checkpoint is opened.
- 4 August – A new jetty and suspension bridge is officially opened in Tanjong Rhu. This makes it the first suspension bridge to be built in Singapore.
- 21 August – A road interchange to link the Pan Island Expressway and Tampines Expressway is officially opened.
- 26 August – SingTel successfully launches Singapore's first commercial satellite, ST-1, into orbit following a lift-off from Kourou, French Guiana.

=== September ===
- 3 September – Saving Private Ryan becomes the first film in Singapore to be rated NC-16.
- 5 September – The Singapore national football team wins the 1998 Tiger Cup, winning Vietnam with a 1–0.
- 15 September – During TechVenture 98, it is announced that a Science Hub will be built in Buona Vista (now known as one-north), costing about S$5b with a completion time of 15 years.
- 16 September – The Singapore Story, the first volume of Lee Kuan Yew's memoirs is launched.
- 30 September – The HDB Centre starts construction as part of the Estate Renewal Strategy for Toa Payoh, first announced in 1995. The centre, which will serve as the Housing and Development Board, is completed in 2002.

=== October ===
- 5 October – SembCorp is formed from a merger between Singapore Technologies Industrial Corporation and Sembawang Corporation, first announced on 1 June.
- 12 October – FM 96.3 – The International Channel (renamed to XFM 96.3) is launched as a radio station for expatriates.

=== November ===
- November – Causeway Point opens to the public.
- 4 November – Johns Hopkins Medicine and the then National Science and Technology Board (NSTB) established Johns Hopkins Singapore (JHS), which consisted of separate clinical and research units.
- 27 November – Singapore aims to qualify in the FIFA World Cup by 2010, a target known as "Goal 2010".
- 28 November – The Grassroots Club is officially opened, which will strengthen grassroots engagement in Singapore.

=== December ===
- 4 December – The newly refurbished Plaza Singapura reopens its doors after 18 months of renovations.
- 26 December – Keppel TatLee Bank is formed after a successful merger between Keppel Bank and Tat Lee Bank.

=== Date unknown ===
- West Mall and Bukit Panjang Plaza are opened.
- The Paragon shopping centre at Orchard Road is opened.

== Births ==
- 2 May – Ng Jia Xin, Malaysian figure skater
- 6 September – Sheryl Ang, Singaporean actress
- 31 October – Amos Yee, Singaporean convicted offender and former blogger, YouTuber, and child actor

== Deaths ==
- 6 January – Dini Haryati, murder victim of an unsolved case (b. 1978).
- 13 January – Iordanka Apostolova, murder victim of Shaiful Edham Adam and Norishyam Mohamed Ali (b. 1972).
- 18 January – Wang Sa, comedian (b. 1925).
- 8 February – Percy McNeice, former President of the City Council of Singapore (b. 1901).
- 21 February – Syed Ali Redha Alsagoff, former UMNO City Councillor for Telok Blangah Constituency and 6th President of the Singapore Malay Chamber of Commerce and Industry (b. 1927).
- 21 March – Seah Mui Kok, former PAP Member of Parliament for Bukit Ho Swee Constituency and 4th Secretary-General of the National Trade Union Congress (b. 1923).
- 25 March – Cheng An Lun, educator and former Principal of the Chinese High School (b. 1910).
- 28 March – Raphael Alfred Gonzales, former PAP Member of Parliament for Serangoon Gardens Constituency (b. 1922).
- 20 April – Sally Poh Bee Eng, murder victim in the Rolex watch murder (b. 1955–1956).
- 26 April – Halford Boudewyn, long-serving police officer (b. 1921).
- 10 May – Jaranjeet Singh, murder victim of Saminathan Subramaniam and S. Nagarajan Kuppusamy (b. 1958).
- 18 May – Wang Sui Pick, prominent Chinese calligrapher (b. 1904).
- 26 June – Wong Chooi Sen, former Secretary to the Cabinet (b. 1920).
- 11 August – Ooi Ang Yen, murder victim in the Bukit Merah stabbing (b. 1955).
- 26 August – Tan Eng Yan, murder victim in the Tampines flat murder (b. 1948).
- 18 October – Linn In Hua, former President of the Singapore Chinese Chamber of Commerce and Industry and Hokkien community leader (b. 1924).
- 26 November – Rajabali Jumabhoy, prominent businessman and former legislative assemblyman for Telok Ayer Constituency (b. 1898).
- 7 December – Tann Wee Tiong, founder of Rajah & Tann and founding member of the People's Action Party (b. 1915).
- 27 December – Jalil Haron, 5th President of the Singapore Malay Chamber of Commerce and Industry (b. 1934).
