= 1992 in Singapore =

- Decades: 1970s; 1980s; 1990s; 2000s; 2010s
- See also: Other events of 1992; Timeline of Singaporean history

Events from the year 1992 in Singapore.

== Incumbents ==
- President: Wee Kim Wee
- Prime Minister: Goh Chok Tong

== Events ==
=== January ===
- 3 January – Singapore bans the sale of chewing gum in a bid to prevent disruption to MRT services and reduce gum litter-related issues. This came after two incidents where MRT doors were unable to close fully due to gum. In 2004, the ban is partially lifted for gums with medicinal value.
- 10 January – The Ministry of Education announced the Trim and Fit scheme for overweight children.
- 28 January – The ASEAN Free Trade Area agreement is signed.

=== February ===
- 18 February – The International Business Park is launched in Jurong, making it the first business park in Singapore.

=== April ===
- April – The Jurong Bird Park Panorail starts operations.
- 1 April
  - The Institute of Technical Education is established from the previous Vocational and Industrial Training Board (VITB) to improve vocational education, a day after its launch.
  - Nanyang Polytechnic is formed as Singapore's fourth polytechnic.
  - The Telecommunication Authority of Singapore is reconstituted, resulting in the corporatisation of SingTel and Singapore Post. SingTel and SingPost will hold a telecommunications licence and postal licence respectively for 15 years.
  - Tradewinds is rebranded to SilkAir as part of an overhaul, first announced on 12 March.
- 2 April – SCV launches NewsVision, a news cable channel. This marks the start of cable television.
- 20 April – The Night Courts are set up as part of the Subordinate Courts, which mainly deal with traffic and regulatory offences. This helps ease the workload of dealing with many court cases.

=== May ===
- May
  - The first Singapore Green Plan is introduced.
  - The Singapore Green Labelling Scheme is launched to certify products that are friendly to the environment.
- 1 May – The National Council of Social Service is formed to coordinate Voluntary Welfare Organisations in Singapore.
- 11 May – The oldest Hokkien temple in Singapore, Heng San Teng Temple located at Jalan Bukit Merah, was besieged in a fire and one man was killed.
- 28 May – Yishun 10 is opened as Singapore's first multiplex, owned by Golden Village.

=== June ===
- 1 June – SCV launches MovieVision and VarietyVision, both of which are entertainment channels.

=== July ===
- 14 July – Construction for the Woodlands MRT extension starts.

=== August ===
- 19 August – The first school rankings for secondary schools are published.

=== September ===
- 1 September – The Inland Revenue Authority of Singapore is formed to take charge of tax collection matters in Singapore.
- 10 September – The Special Operations Command is formed to combine the Police Task Force, the Police Tactical Team and the Police Dog Unit into a single command.
- 29 September – A fire at the Senoko Power Station cuts power to Singapore for 13 hours.

=== October ===
- 25 October – Fitzpatrick's Holdings (now Dairy Farm International) announced the acquisition of Cold Storage stores. The deal takes effect the following year.

=== November ===
- 1 November – A corrective work order takes effect for litterbugs, which mandates them to clean up areas instead of just paying a fine.
- 14 November – Northpoint Shopping Centre (now Northpoint City) opens to the public.
- 23 November – Temasek Polytechnic's new campus starts construction in Tampines. The new campus, which offers panoramic views of Bedok Reservoir, will be completed by July 1995. The campus officially opened in 1997.
- 28 November – The first school rankings for junior colleges are published.

=== December ===
- 15 December – The Sentosa Causeway is officially opened. It is a road link that connects Sentosa with mainland Singapore.

== Births ==
- 14 January – Benjamin Khoh, lawyer and actor.
- 23 February – Tabitha Nauser, singer
- 23 March – By2, composed of twins Miko Bai Wei-Fen (白緯芬) and Yumi Bai Wei-Ling (白緯玲).
- 7 April – Rahimah Rahim, singer and actress
- 25 April – Lynette Lim, swimmer.
- 18 August – Quah Ting Wen, swimmer.
- 12 September – Shigga Shay, singer.
- 22 September – Julie Tan, actress.

== Deaths ==
- 2 February – Shirin Fozdar, founder of the Singapore Council of Women and a prominent member of the Baha'i Community in Singapore (b. 1905).
- 9 February – Stanley Toft Steward, 1st High Commissioner of Singapore to Australia (b. 1910).
- 9 March – Ling Tien Gi, chemist and physician (b. 1898).
- 6 April – George Edwin Bogaars, last director of Special Branch and former head of the Singapore Civil Service (b. 1926).
- 6 May – Lim Bong Soo, tennis player (b. 1900).
- 16 July – Justinian de Souza, former Principal of Saint Patrick's School and Saint Joseph Institution (b. 1906).
- 25 July – Chua Boon Unn, businessman (b. 1919).
- 28 October – J. W. D. Ambrose, High Court judge (b. 1909).
- 24 November – Lee Choon Eng, former Labour Front legislative assemblyman for Queenstown Constituency (b. 1915).
- 5 December
  - Andrew Fong Sip Chee, former Minister of State for Culture and former PAP Member of Parliament for Stamford Constituency and Kampong Chai Chee Constituency (b. 1938).
  - Teng Mah Seng, musician, lyricist, composer and former Chairman of the Siong Leng Musical Association (b. 1915).
- 11 December – Woon Wah Siang, civil servant and public administrator (b. 1916).
