= Winifred Danaraj =

Singaporean professor (1916–1977)

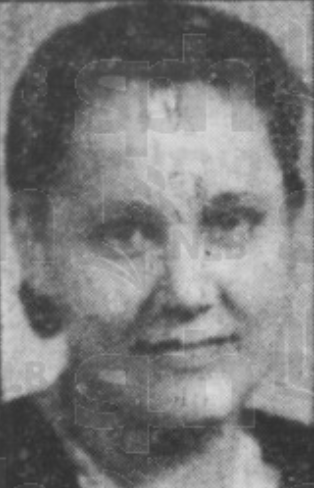
Danaraj in 1952

Winifred Danaraj (née Lewis; 8 August 1916 – 16 March 1977) was the first female professor of the University of Malaya in Singapore and the first Malayan woman to obtain a Master of Public Health degree.

== Early life and education ==
Danaraj attended the Raffles Girls' School and was an early member of the Girls' Sports Club. She studied at the King Edward VII College of Medicine, graduating from the school with a Licentiate in Medicine and Surgery and distinctions in bacteriology, pathology, pharmacology, materia medica, medical jurisprudence and public health in 1938.

In 1952, she graduated from the Harvard T.H. Chan School of Public Health in Boston, Massachusetts with the Degree of Master of Public Health, becoming the first Malayan woman to obtain the degree. In the same year, she became a post-graduate student in child health at the University of London, which she graduated from with a diploma.

== Career ==
After graduation, she served across Malaya before establishing a private practice in 1947. She also worked at the KK Women's and Children's Hospital in this period. She became a lecturer with the Department of Social Medicine and Public Health of the University of Malaya in Singapore in October 1949. In 1958, she became a senior lecturer with the department. In December 1961, she was appointed the university's Professor of Social Medicine and Public Health, becoming the university's first female professor. By then, she had become "well-known for her articles in leading medical journals." She was also a member of several local professional associations and had represented Singapore at several conferences.

In 1964, Danaraj and her husband, Dr. T. J. Danaraj, moved to Kuala Lumpur where they were appointed the University of Malaya of Malaysia's Professor of Social Medicine and Public Health, and Foundation Dean and Professor of Medicine respectively. As the first professor to chair the Department of Social and Preventive Medicine, she was able to develop it as she believed best. She was also involved in designing the institution's medical curriculum, in which she increased the prominence of social and preventative medicine. With the Malaysian Ministry of Health, she organised programmes where medical students of the university would be able to visit rural districts and learn of the issues faced by public health officers there. She also developed a Master of Public Health programme with the ministry which was introduced in 1974. While teaching, she frequently used a "large blackboard set‐square". The set-square is still extant, and has been placed on display at the University of Malaya in Kuala Lumpur as "Winnie Danaraj's Favourite Teaching Tool".

== Personal life and death ==
Danaraj married Dr. Thamboo John Danaraj, the first Dean of Medical Faculty of the University of Malaya in Singapore, with whom she had two children. After suffering from a months-long illness, she died on 16 March 1977.
