= 1997 in Singapore =

- Decades: 1970s; 1980s; 1990s; 2000s; 2010s
- See also: Other events of 1997; Timeline of Singaporean history

The following lists events that happened during 1997 in Singapore.

== Incumbents ==
- President: Ong Teng Cheong
- Prime Minister: Goh Chok Tong

== Events ==
=== January ===
- January –
  - The Singapore Kindness Movement is officially launched.
- 2 January – In the 1997 General Election, the People's Action Party team led by Goh Chok Tong won 81 out of 83 seats (including 47 uncontested seats) with a vote share of 65.0%. The opposition won the remaining two, with one seat going to the Workers' Party and the Singapore People's Party winning the other seat. Meanwhile, the Singapore Democratic Party lost all three seats.
- 18 January - Eastpoint Mall was officially opened by Minister for National Development Lim Hng Kiang.
- 25 January – Temasek Polytechnic's new campus is officially opened.

=== February ===
- 1 February – 3 new cinemas were opened:
  - Studio City Cinemas Central Mall,
  - Studio City Cinemas Eastpoint and,
  - White Sands Cineplex, managed by Eng Wah Organisation.
- 15 February –
  - The Battle Box museum is officially opened.
  - The Toa Payoh Hospital and Changi Hospital are closed and merged into New Changi Hospital.
- 24 February – The Ministry of Home Affairs (MHA) has launched the Home Team concept, which aims to strengthen collaboration between agencies of MHA.

=== March ===
- 1 March – The National Dental Centre Singapore starts operations.
- 7 March – The Senoko Gasworks officially opened. That facility replaced Kallang Gasworks (which closed in 1998).

=== April ===
- 1 April – M1 launches cellular services. It is the second telco after SingTel.
- 14 April – Neptune Orient Lines announced that it will buy APL Logistics in a merger.
- 21 April – The Asian Civilisations Museum is officially opened.

=== May ===
- 17 May – National Education is launched to encourage national cohesion and national identity.
- 19 May – SingPost launches the SAM machines, allowing people to buy stamps on the go.
- 30 May – The Singapore Expo starts construction to replace World Trade Centre Halls 1 and 2, first announced on 24 July 1996. The MTI will appoint PSA to run the centre.

=== June ===
- June – A new standard for grading food stalls is launched, with hygiene, cleanliness and housekeeping standards taken into account. There are four grades, mainly A, B, C and D.
- 2 June – The Ministry of Education unveiled a new strategy known as 'Thinking Schools, Learning Nation'. The new strategy aims to encourage lifelong learning and creativity.
- 9 June – The Singapore ONE broadband network is launched with new interactive features, making Singapore the first country in the world to have such a system. The network is launched commercially in 1998. 2,000 people were enrolled as part of the first trial, a quarter of which had successful connections.
- 12 June – 12 Storeys, a local films, is released in cinemas. It becomes the first-ever Singapore film to be shown during the Cannes Film Festival.
- 25 June – Changi Business Park is launched by JTC.

=== July ===
- July – Singapore slips into recession during the Asian financial crisis.
- 21 July – Racial Harmony Day is celebrated for the first time, commemorating the 1964 Race Riots.
- 22 July – Suntec City, a mixed-use development with a convention centre officially opened.
- 28 July – Dover MRT station is announced to link commuters to Singapore Polytechnic, with completion by 2001.

=== August ===
- 2 August – The Esplanade Bridge and the Nicoll Highway extension is opened to traffic, after its official opening held the day before.
- 5 August – The Land Transport Authority awards SMRT the licence to operate the Bukit Panjang LRT line due to its experience with the MRT.
- 20 August – A landmark appeal of Abdul Nasir Amer Hamsah led to the definition of life imprisonment to change from "life" to "natural life" from the day after 20 August 1997 onwards for future offences. At that time before 20 August 1997, life imprisonment in Singapore was defined as a jail term of 20 years, entitled with the usual practice of one-third remission for good behaviour. Chief Justice Yong Pung How, in the Court of Appeal, also decided that life imprisonment should be considered as a term of incarceration for the remainder of a convicted prisoner's natural life, with the possibility of parole after serving at least 20 years.

=== September ===
- 2 September – Senoko Fishing Port starts operations, moving from Punggol for the construction of Punggol New Town. It officially opened on 6 December.
- 3 September – Construction starts on the Automobile Megamart, a car hub in Ubi.
- 12 September – Raffles Medical Group and Pidemco Land (now CapitaLand) formed a joint-venture company to convert Blanco Court into a hospital, which is the second-largest private hospital in Singapore. The hospital will be later known as Raffles Hospital.
- 15 September – Singapore Airlines launches KrisWorld, the world's first airline to have an inflight system.
- 18 September – The haze came to Singapore, which caused the Pollutant Standards Index to reach a record of 226 then (since surpassed by 401 during the June 2013 haze).
- 19 September – The Ministry of the Environment announced a haze management plan. In it, schools and sports complexes will shut when the Pollutant Standards Index reaches past 300. Sirens will sound when levels reach past 400.

=== October ===
- October –
  - Great World City opens to the public.
  - Cathay Cineleisure Orchard opens on the former site of Orchard Cinema.
- 1 October –
  - PSA Corporation (present-day PSA International) is formed as a result of corporatisation of port activities.
  - The Community Involvement Programme is launched.
- 10 October – The new KK Women's and Children's Hospital building is officially opened.

=== November ===
- 8 November – The first i-Weekly issue is published.
- 12 November – SBS Limited is now known as DelGro Corporation (present day ComfortDelGro).
- 15 November – SingTel launches Magix, a broadband network.
- 17 November – The Ayer Rajah Expressway extension to Tuas is officially opened, formed by the expansion of Jalan Ahmad Ibrahim into an expressway. The route will cater for the opening of the Second Link in 1998.
- 19 November – The Singapore Tourism Promotion Board is renamed the Singapore Tourism Board.
- 25 November – Construction of the North East MRT line starts. In addition, the Land Transport Authority has been conducting studies on potential MRT extensions.

=== December ===
- 8 December – ST Engineering was created from a merger of four companies, namely ST Aerospace, ST Electronics, ST Kinetics and ST Marine. The merger was announced earlier on 28 August.
- 19 December – SilkAir Flight 185 crashes into Musi River near Palembang, Sumatra, killing all 104 people on board.
- 31 December – The National Arts Council launched Passion 99.5FM, a radio station focused on the arts.

=== Date unknown ===
- Hougang Mall and Anchorpoint are opened.

== Births ==
- 24 January – Samantha Yeo, swimmer
- 24 December – Marina Chan, swimmer

== Deaths ==
- 27 January – Abdul Wahab Ghows, former judge of the Supreme Court (b. 1921).
- 13 February – Hajjah Halijah A. Hamid Almunawarah, founder and former managing director of Halijah Travels (b. 1959).
- 12 March – Tan Tiong Huat, murder victim of Lim Thian Lai (b. 1954).
- 13 March – Sivapackiam Veerappan Rengasamy, murder victim in the Kallang landlady murder (b. 1944).
- 26 March – Lloyd Valberg, sole competitor for 1948 Summer Olympics (b. 1922).
- 15 May – Ong Soo Chuan, former Parliamentary Secretary to the Ministry of Foreign Affairs and former PAP Member of Parliament for Nee Soon Constituency (b. 1938).
- 20 June – Philip Low, murder victim in the Duck Den murder (b. 1932).
- 23 September – Rahim Hamid, singer (b. 1929).
- 26 September – Lim Ngee Hong, founder and Chairman of the Kwan-In Welfare Society (b. 1936).
- 9 October – Ang Kok Peng, former PAP Member of Parliament for Crawford Constituency and Buona Vista Constituency (b. 1927).
- 12 October – Lee Chin Koon, storekeeper for Shell and father of Lee Kuan Yew (b. 1903).
- 19 December – Bonny Hicks, model and writer (b. 1968).
