= 1994 in Singapore =

- Decades: 1970s; 1980s; 1990s; 2000s; 2010s
- See also: Other events of 1994; Timeline of Singaporean history

The following lists events that happened during 1994 in Singapore.

== Incumbents ==
- President: Ong Teng Cheong
- Prime Minister: Goh Chok Tong

== Events ==
=== January ===
- 4 January - The Straits Times Industrials Index hits a record high of 2471.90 points, now-former record has been surpassed in 2000 with a record high of 2582.94.
- 22 January – Junction 8 is officially opened.

=== February ===
- 1 February - Radio Singapore International (RSI) is launched as Singapore's first international shortwave radio station.

=== March ===
- 2 March – The extension of the CISCO headquarters starts construction. When completed, it will have cash processing facilities and a computer disaster recovery centre.
- 8 March – The first 2G networks are launched in Singapore.
- 13 March – The National Service Resort and Country Club is officially opened.
- 26 March – Singapore wins the bid to host the 1999 Rotary Convention.

=== April ===
- 1 April – The Goods and Services Tax (GST) is first introduced with a tax rate of 3%.

=== May ===
- 5 May – United States media reports on the caning incident of American teenager Michael P. Fay who was convicted for vandalism.
- 21 May – A Singapore Police Force officer, Corporal Hoi Kim Heng, 24, dies after being stabbed in the neck during the attempted arrest of drug abuser Soh Loo Ban. His companion, Corporal Tan Huang Yee, recovers from his injuries.
- 23 May – Corporal Tan Huang Yee is given a rare field promotion to the rank of sergeant, while Corporal Hoi Kim Heng is conferred the same award posthumously.
- 26 May – The Night Safari is officially opened.
- 31 May – The Great Singapore Sale is launched.

=== June ===
- 6 June – Known as the Oriental Hotel Murder, a Japanese tourist, Madam Fujii Isae, 49, is found murdered in her hotel room at the Oriental Hotel.
- 9 June – The biggest single robbery to strike a private home occurs at a property in Bukit Timah, in which S$6 million worth of valuables were stolen. All five men involved in the armed robbery were subsequently arrested.

=== July ===
- 1 July – SingTel launches SingNet, Singapore's first Internet service provider.
- 21 July – The design for the new arts centre is unveiled, with the name of the facility called the Esplanade - Theatres on the Bay, which will be finished by 2000. It opened in 2002.

=== September ===
- 1 September – SingTel launched its fully digitalised telecom network.
- 2 September – Tuas Naval Base is officially opened.
- 16 September – A sergeant with the Republic of Singapore Navy, Chong Peh Choong, 26, kills his three children aged between 3 and 10 before failing in his attempts to kill his wife and himself. He was jailed for life.
- 23 September
  - Dutchman Johannes van Damme is executed for drug trafficking.
  - FM97.2 starts broadcasting.

=== October ===
- 1 October – Singapore Broadcasting Authority is formed.
- 15 October – Madam Mona Koh, 46, a mamasan, survives two gunshot wounds at Katong People's Complex.
- 22 October - The last National Registration Identity Card (NRIC) replacement exercise takes place in Choa Chu Kang Community Club, marking the end of a three-year replacement programme. For those who did not re-register yet, a grace period will be given until 1995. From 1 January 1996, the old laminated NRICs will be invalid.
- 31 October to 3 November – A three-day debate on ministerial salaries ensues. Eventually, the white paper is approved on 3 November.
- 31 October – Power98FM is launched by SAFRA.

=== November ===
- November – Tiong Bahru Plaza opens to the public.
- 21 November – The Singapore People's Party is formed after several members broke off from the Singapore Democratic Party.
- 30 November – Police officer Senior Staff Sergeant Boo Tiang Huat, 47, dies after sustaining an axe wound to the head while conducting routine vehicular inspection at Newton Road. He was given a field promotion to the rank of Station Inspector posthumously.

=== Date unknown ===
- The Singapore Heart Centre starts operations.

== Births ==
- 1 January – Carrie Wong, television actress
- 8 January - Shawn Tok, singer-actor
- 1 October - Linying, the singer for NDP 2021 theme song 'The Road Ahead'.
- 5 November – Timothee Yap, national sprinter.
- 13 November – Andrew Tang, racing driver.

== Deaths ==
- 3 January – Neo Ah Lark, representative from Singapore who attended a forum on WW2 reparations for the people of Asia-Pacific in Tokyo, Japan and the sixth son of Lim Chu Kang pioneer Neo Ao Tiew (b. 1934).
- 24 January – F. A. Chua, Supreme Court Judge (b. 1913).
- 11 February – Gog Sing Hooi, pioneer watercolour painter (b. 1933).
- 16 February – Ong Say Yeo, former Liberal Socialist Party city councillor for Pasir Panjang Constituency (b. 1914).
- 24 February – Venerable Kong Hiap, 3rd President of the Singapore Buddhist Federation and leader of the Singapore Buddhist Lodge (b. 1900).
- 7 March – P. V. Sarma, veteran trade unionist and former leader of the Malayan National Liberation League (b. 1916).
- 17 April – Wu Teh Yao, educator and political scientist (b. 1915).
- 25 April – James Aeria, former Commander of the Singapore Maritime Command (b. 1931).
- 26 April – Venerable Tat Inn, founder and abbot of the Tse Toh Aum Temple (b. 1912).
- 23 May – Mohamed Awang, former Deputy President of the Singapore Malay National Organisation and candidate for Jurong SMC during the 1988 and 1991 General Elections (b. 1942).
- 24 August – Ee Peng Liang, businessman and philanthropist (b. 1913).
- 4 November – Syed Esa Almenoar, former Secretary-General of the Singapore Malay National Organisation (b. 1918).
- 8 November – Kwek Hong Png, founder of Hong Leong Group (b. 1913).
- 10 December – Jamit Singh, veteran trade unionist (b. 1929).
