= 1997 Kallang landlady murder =

1997 robbery and murder of a landlady in Singapore

Sivapackiam Veerappan Rengasamy
- Born: Sivapackiam Veerappan Rengasamy c. 1944; Singapore
- Died: 13 March 1997 (aged 53); King George's Avenue, Kallang, Singapore
- Cause of death: Stab wounds to the neck
- Resting place: An unspecified cemetery in Singapore
- Occupation: Landlady
- Known for: Murder victim
- Children: Selvan Nagalingam (son); Unnamed eldest son

On 13 March 1997, at one of the HDB flats in King George's Avenue, Kallang, Singapore, 53-year-old Sivapackiam Veerappan Rengasamy was discovered dead in her bedroom by her son. Sivapackiam was found to have been stabbed three times in the neck and she died from the wounds. During police investigations, Sivapackiam's tenant Gerardine Andrew, a 36-year-old prostitute, told police that on the day of the murder, she returned to the flat and saw three people attacking her landlady and robbing her, and they threatened her to leave after briefly holding her hostage.

The three suspects - Kamala Rani Balakrishnan, her brother Mansoor Abdullah and Mansoor's friend Nazar Mohamed Kassim - were all arrested within the next few days. It was determined from the trio's confessions that the mastermind of the robbery was actually Gerardine, the same tenant who rented a room from Sivapackiam. Apparently, Gerardine was unsatisfied with the tensions between her and her landlady and thus asked the three to assault and rob Sivapackiam, but Gerardine insisted she never intended to kill her landlady. Gerardine and the three suspects were all charged with murder.

Eventually, the two men - Nazar and Mansoor - were convicted of murder and sentenced to death while Gerardine was sentenced to eight years' imprisonment for culpable homicide not amounting to murder in their joint trial. However, the prosecution's subsequent appeal led to Gerardine being sentenced to death for the original charge of murder, and she was executed alongside the two men in February 1999. Kamala was the sole person out of the four to escape the gallows after she was sentenced to seven years' imprisonment for culpable homicide and conspiracy to commit robbery in a separate trial.

== Murder and investigation ==
On 13 March 1997, at around 8.20am in the morning, Selvan Nagalingam, who lived together with his 53-year-old mother Sivapackiam Veerappan Rengasamy at their flat in King George's Avenue, Kallang, left the flat for work. Selvan returned home two hours and ten minutes later after his eldest brother told him he could not get in contact with their mother. Upon arriving, Selvan found his mother's lifeless corpse in her bedroom.

After Selvan contacted the police, Inspector Yeo Bee Poh of the Criminal Investigation Department (CID) led her team of detectives to investigate the case. Among the witnesses Inspector Yeo interviewed, one of them was 34-year-old Indian prostitute Gerardine Andrew (alias Maria), who rented a room at Sivapackiam's flat for two and a half months prior to the case. Gerardine told police that earlier on, when she returned home after visiting her son, she encountered three robbers, whom she described as an Indian female and two Indian males, attacking her landlady and demanding her to hand over her valuables. One of the men threatened Gerardine with a knife and asked her to search the flat for any valuables but Gerardine failed to locate any. Hence, the robbers forced Gerardine to leave the flat and threatened her to not contact the police. Despite Gerardine's status as a witness at this point, Inspector Yeo suspected Gerardine due to her nervousness and unusual body language during questioning.

After Gerardine's witness statement, the police arrested the three suspected robbers, and they were all charged with murder. The first robber to be arrested was a 21-year-old unemployed man Mansoor Abdullah on 14 March 1997, while his 22-year-old sister and prostitute Kamala Rani Balakrishnan was caught at the Woodlands Checkpoint on 17 March 1997. The third and final robber to be caught was 26-year-old coffee shop assistant Nazar Mohamed Kassim on 16 May 1997. All the three robbers confessed to the robbery and assault of the landlady, with both Mansoor and Nazar being deemed responsible for the fatal assault of Sivapackiam. However, all three robbers stated that it was Gerardine who planned the robbery and assault, and was the mastermind of their crimes. Gerardine was arrested after Mansoor's capture and like the trio, she was charged with murder and she later confessed she did mastermind the robbery. It was revealed that Gerardine were friends with the trio, and prior to the case, both Nazar and Mansoor were homeless and slept at the streets of Farrer Park Stadium. Mansoor was also revealed to be wanted by the Singapore Civil Defence Force (SCDF) for desertion of his conscription duties.

== Trial proceedings ==
=== Trial and sentence of Kamala ===
Kamala Rani Balakrishnan, the sole conspirator of the four to have her murder charge dismissed before trial.

On 20 October 1997, one of the four conspirators - Kamala Rani Balakrishnan - was the first to be tried for the robbery and assault of Sivapackiam Veerappan Rengasamy. By then, Kamala's murder charge was reduced to culpable homicide not amounting to murder. She was also charged with having taken part in the conspiracy with the other three suspects to commit the robbery and assault on Sivapackiam. Kamala pleaded guilty to her lower charges and was sentenced to seven years' imprisonment.

=== Murder trial of Gerardine, Nazar and Mansoor ===
On 12 January 1998, the remaining three suspects - Gerardine Andrew, Mansoor Abdullah and Nazar Mohamed Kassim - claimed trial for murder in the High Court. High Court judge Kan Ting Chiu was the presiding judge of the case, and the prosecution was led by Deputy Public Prosecutor (DPP) Bala Reddy of the Attorney-General's Chambers (AGC). Edward D'Souza represented Mansoor as his lawyer, while Christina Goh acted as Gerardine's defence counsel, and Nazar engaged David Rasif as his lawyer for the trial.

The summary of the events based on the four suspects' confessions revealed that during her time as Sivapackiam's tenant, Gerardine had arguments with Sivapackiam over several issues (including her rent and limitations of her use of the telephone) and the frequent verbal abuse Sivapackiam spewed at Gerardine for her occupation and behaviour, which led to the hampering of the good relationship Gerardine originally shared with her landlady. After one particularly intense quarrel with her landlady, Gerardine met up with her friends Kamala, Mansoor and Nazar, telling them her troubles and distress. At that point, Gerardine asked her three friends to assault her landlady, and she also promised them they could steal the landlady's jewellery, cash and gold accessories. Although Gerardine and Mansoor confirmed that the plan was to beat up the landlady, Nazar however, claimed Gerardine told them to kill Sivapackiam.

Mansoor's account of the crime was that on the day he came to Sivapackiam's flat, he and Nazar were supposed to pretend to be potential tenants looking to rent a room from Sivapackiam in order to enter her flat to execute their robbery and assault plan while Kamala and Gerardine would wait for the men near the staircases outside the flat. Mansoor said both he and Nazar received gloves from Gerardine to avoid leaving fingerprints at the crime scene. Upon entry, Mansoor and Nazar restrained the landlady in her bedroom, and Mansoor used a thin iron chain to strangle Sivapackiam, who was still struggling. Nazar, meanwhile, used a clay bowl to hit Sivapackiam's head and even took out a knife to stab Sivapackiam three times on the neck, and the stabbing led to the death of 53-year-old Sivapackiam. Mansoor said in his defence he never had the intention to cause death or at least fatal injuries to Sivapackiam, and he only wanted to rob the landlady of her jewellery and cash. He also stated that after the landlady was killed, he and the others searched the flat but could not find the valuables owned by the landlady and hence, they escaped the flat empty-handed. The escape of the four robbers were witnessed by Sivapackiam's neighbour Ngo Ah Poo and Ngo's younger god-sister Tay Cheow Tee, who both became the prosecution's witnesses.

From Gerardine's account, she stated that aside from the occasional conflicts they had with each other, she and Sivapackiam normally shared a good relationship with each other. Gerardine also said she never wanted to cause the death of her landlady despite having solicited the robbery plan and assault, and she only wanted the landlady to be beaten up and robbed of her valuables, and also said she did not know Nazar had taken a knife with him to commit the robbery. However, the prosecution raised the fact that while Gerardine genuinely did not intend to cause Sivapackiam's death, the fact that her direction of the robbery plan and assault having led to the landlady's death demonstrated that there was an intention to cause not merely simple injury, but also serious harm to the landlady, and her alleged awareness of dangerous weapons in Nazar's possession should be factors pointing to Gerardine's guilt for murder under the law.

Lastly, from Nazar's account, he did not deny stabbing Sivapackiam to her death, and his account of what happened before the assault was similar to Mansoor. He claimed he only took the knife just to threaten the landlady during the robbery. However, in court, Nazar additionally stated he suffered from temporary insanity and a mental blackout during the course of stabbing, as a result of headaches caused by a childhood traumatic injury to his head. His poor academic performance at school and dysfunctional family background (Nazar was raised by foster mother since young) were also factors cited by his lawyer to show the aftermath of Nazar's childhood accident and how he gone astray. However, the prosecution rebutted that Nazar had full control of his mental faculties and able to coherently and clearly describe the sequence of events on the day of the murder, and the prosecution's psychiatrist Chan Keen Loong confirmed there was no abnormality of mind exhibited by Nazar during the commission of the offence.

=== Murder trial verdict ===
Mansoor Abdullah, one of the two men sentenced to death.

Nazar Mohamed Kassim, one of the two men sentenced to death.

After a 17-day trial, High Court judge Kan Ting Chiu decided on his verdict and delivered it on 6 February 1998.

In the case of Mansoor, Justice Kan stated that Mansoor may not have the intention to cause death, but he and Nazar together shared the common intention to rob and assault the landlady, and in furtherance of both the men's common intention, Nazar intentionally inflicted the knife injuries on Sivapackiam and the stabbing led to her death. Based on the legal concept of common intention, Mansoor should share the same culpability with Nazar for the offence of murder and thus, Justice Kan found Mansoor guilty of murder.

In the case of Gerardine, Justice Kan accepted that Gerardine did not have the intention to solicit the murder of her landlady, and had no intention to cause Sivapackiam's death, based on the fact that she did not tell her accomplices to cause death or serious injury to Sivapackiam. He also accepted that Gerardine was not aware of Nazar carrying the knife with him prior to the robbery, after he found the inconsistency between Nazar and Mansoor's testimonies on whether she was aware of the knife. Justice Kan stated that since there was no intention on Gerardine's part to cause Sivapackiam to die despite having directed the robbery and assault plan, he decided to dismiss the murder charge against Gerardine and convict her of culpable homicide not amounting to murder (or manslaughter).

Finally, turning to the case of Nazar, Justice Kan rejected Nazar's defence of diminished responsibility, as he found Nazar able to coherently recount every little detail of how he attacked and murdered Sivapackiam, and in the aftermath of the killing, Nazar had the consciousness of cleaning himself up, changing into a fresh set of clothes and disposed of his bloodstained clothes, which demonstrated he had full control of his mental faculties. Since he did not have any abnormality of the mind, and that he intentionally inflicted knife injuries on Sivapackiam, for which the wounds were in the ordinary cause of nature could lead to death, there were sufficient grounds to find Nazar guilty of murder.

As such, both 22-year-old Mansoor Abdullah and 27-year-old Nazar Mohamed Kassim were sentenced to the mandatory death penalty, the only sentence permitted for murder under the laws of Singapore. On the other hand, 35-year-old Gerardine Andrew, who was convicted of manslaughter instead of murder, was spared the gallows and hence, she was sentenced to eight years' imprisonment.

== Prosecution's appeal ==
The mastermind, Gerardine Andrew, whose eight-year term of imprisonment was increased to death by the Court of Appeal.

On 3 August 1998, the prosecution submitted an appeal against Gerardine's conviction. They argued that Gerardine should be guilty of the original charge of murder and requested to the Court of Appeal to overturn both her conviction for culpable homicide and her eight-year sentence.

The prosecution highlighted that Gerardine, to an extent, had knowledge of the knife that Nazar carried with him to Sivapackiam's flat, as confirmed by Nazar's confession and court testimony, as well as Gerardine's first testimony of her seeing the knife in Nazar's hand. The prosecution also argued that while planning the robbery and assault of Sivapackiam, Gerardine and her group did not have the mere intention to rob the landlady and cause simple hurt, but there was also an intention to cause grievous hurt or inflict serious injury to the landlady. Finally, the prosecution pointed out that direct participation in the act should not be the only reason to convict a person of murder as they cited past court cases, highlighting that Gerardine's acts of giving the men gloves, leading them to Sivapackiam's flat and instructing them the next steps in the robbery and assault plan amounted to sufficient grounds to warrant a guilty verdict of murder in Gerardine's case.

On 9 September 1998, the Court of Appeal allowed the prosecution's appeal and thus convicted Gerardine of the original charge of murder in relation to Sivapackiam's murder, as they found that although Gerardine had no genuine intention to cause her landlady's death, she should be held indirectly responsible for the actions of Nazar and Mansoor who both assaulted Sivapackiam under her direction and the premeditated assault itself resulted in the death of Sivapackiam. They also added that even if not present at the scene of crime, Gerardine's acts constituted as an offence of murder due to her role of masterminding the robbery and assault, as well as the common intention she shared with Mansoor, Kamala and Nazar to commit the robbery and assault, which led to Sivapackiam's death during these offences. Due to her conviction for the capital charge of murder, 36-year-old Gerardine Andrew's eight-year jail term was revoked, and she was automatically sentenced to death by the Court of Appeal.

On the same date when the prosecution's appeal was first heard, both Mansoor and Nazar lost their appeals against their capital sentences. Upon hearing that Gerardine was sentenced to death through the prosecution's appeal, Sivapackiam's son Selvan Nagalingam commented that if only his late mother knew earlier about Gerardine's occupation and personal issues, she would not have died at the hands of Gerardine and her three friends.

== Executions and aftermath ==
On the Friday morning of 26 February 1999, the three convicted killers - 36-year-old Gerardine Andrew, 23-year-old Mansoor Abdullah and 28-year-old Nazar Mohamed Kassim - were all hanged at Changi Prison. Gerardine was recalled as one of the few women who were sentenced to death for capital crimes in Singapore (which also included Mimi Wong, Tan Mui Choo and Hoe Kah Hong).

In the aftermath of the case and executions, the annual season of Singaporean crime show Crimewatch featured the murder of Sivapackiam as its eighth episode in the same year of the trio's executions, and the episode first aired on 28 April 1999. Another Singaporean crime show named True Files also re-adapted and featured the case. It first aired as the seventh episode of the show's second season on 7 October 2003, and Nazar's former lawyer David Rasif was featured in an on-screen interview relating to his client's case.

The prosecution's appeal verdict, titled Public Prosecutor v Gerardine Andrew, was listed as one of the notable legal cases which touched on the concept of common intention to commit an offence.

== See also ==
- Capital punishment in Singapore
- List of major crimes in Singapore
- Rolex watch murder
