= 1995 in Singapore =

- Decades: 1970s; 1980s; 1990s; 2000s; 2010s
- See also: Other events of 1995; Timeline of Singaporean history

The following is a list of events that occurred in Singapore in 1995.

== Incumbents ==
- President: Ong Teng Cheong
- Prime Minister: Goh Chok Tong

== Events ==
=== February ===
- 26 February – Britain's oldest merchant bank, Barings Bank, collapsed due to the trading activities of Briton Nick Leeson, who incurred losses of $1.4 billion by speculating on the Singapore International Monetary Exchange, primarily through futures contracts. He was arrested on 23 November after fleeing Singapore for 272 days. Leeson subsequently pleaded guilty to two counts of forgery and eight counts of cheating, and was sentenced to six and a half years in prison.

=== March ===
- 1 March – Singapore's Family Court was established.
- 4 March – The Kranji Expressway was officially opened.
- 8 March – Briton John Martin Scripps murdered South African Gerard George Lowe at the River View Hotel, dismembered his body, and disposed of the remains in the Singapore River. He was found guilty of murder and hanged on 19 April 1996.
- 17 March – Flor Contemplacion, a Filipina domestic worker, was hanged for the murder of fellow worker Delia Maga and her three-year-old son, Nicholas Huang which she committed on 4 May 1991.
- 26 March – Walt Disney Television's Satellite Facility officially opened, marking Disney's first international centre. The facility broadcast Disney programmes to Southeast Asia.

=== April ===
- 27 April – ST Teleport was launched for telecommunications and broadcasting purposes.
- Late April – The IKEA Alexandra store, the first new building adjacent to Queensway Shopping Centre, officially opened.

=== May ===
- 2 May – The first C651 trains were put into operation on the North South and East West lines.
- 17 May – The Chinese Heritage Centre was officially opened at Nanyang Technological University, showcasing Chinese culture and history.

=== June ===
- 2 June – The National Day Ceremony song "My People My Home" was unveiled and announced for use in the 1995 National Day Parade. Since then, the NDP has been scheduled at Padang every five years.
- 12 June – Dongli 88.3FM (present-day 883Jia) was launched as a bilingual radio station by SAFRA.
- 23 June – Singapore Cable Vision was officially launched as a cable television provider, offering Singaporeans with more entertainment options. The whole cable system was completed in 1998; initially, coverage was limited to Tampines.
- 24 June – Ren Ci Hospital is officially opened.
- 26 June – MTV Southeast Asia's broadcasting centre was officially opened. It featured production facilities that broadcast MTV in English heralding a wave of American English music video programmes.

=== July ===
- 1 July
  - CityCab began operations, formed through the merger of three taxi companies: Singapore Airport Bus Service Ltd (SABS), Singapore Bus Service Taxi Pte Ltd (SBS Taxi Pte Ltd) and Singapore Commuter Pte Ltd.
  - The West Coast Barter Trade Centre closed due to declining use.

=== August ===
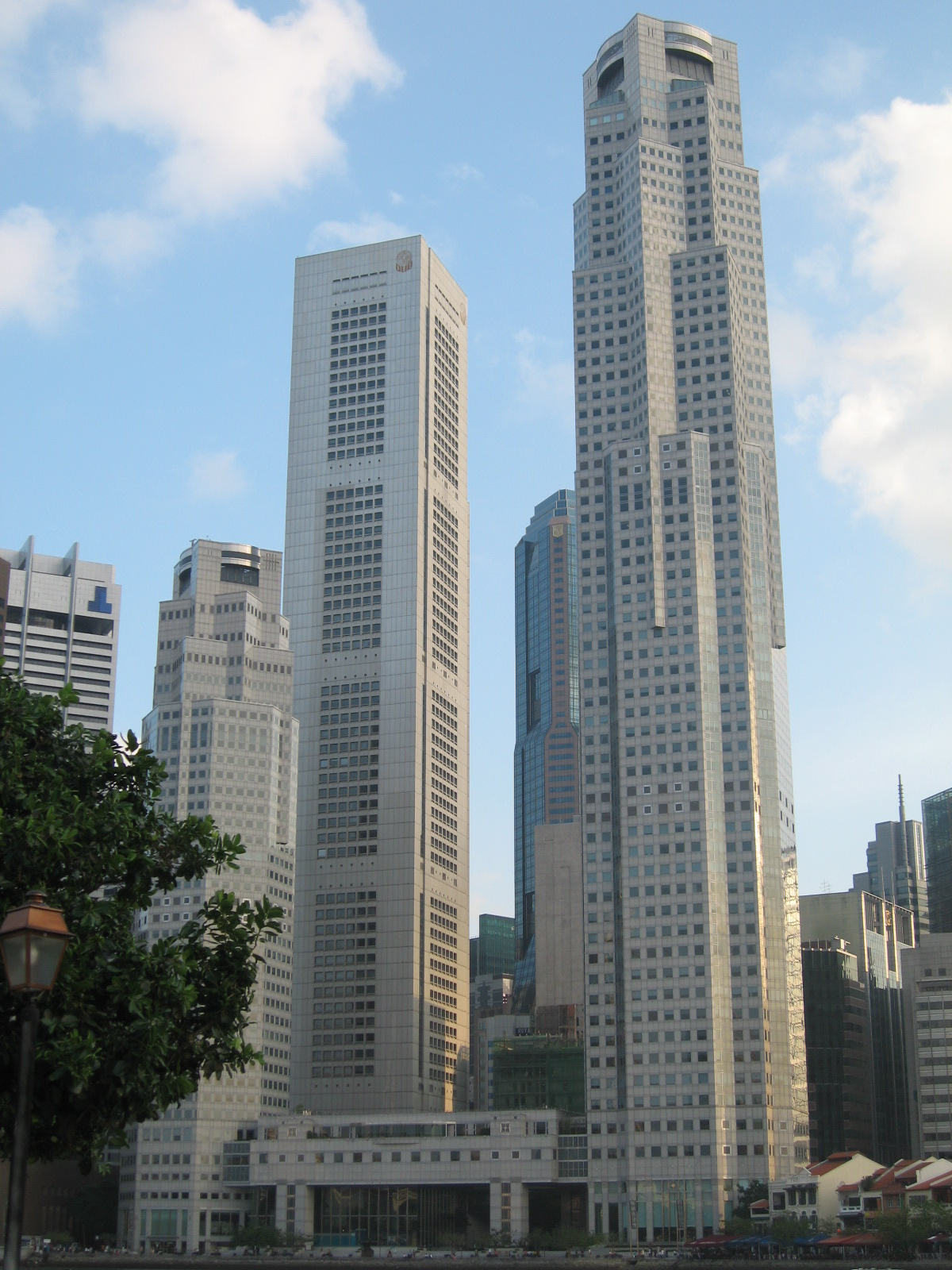
The UOB Plaza

- 1 August – The Seletar Satellite Earth Station was officially opened.
- 6 August – The UOB Plaza was officially opened. It joins the OUB Centre (now One Raffles Place) as one of Singapore's tallest buildings at 280 metres, until Guoco Tower's completion in 2016, which stands 290 metres.
- 20 August – The Selective En bloc Redevelopment Scheme (SERS) was announced to unlock economic value for residential buildings. On the same day, the Executive Condominium scheme was introduced to meet Singaporeans' aspirations for condominium living, which may be too expensive for some.
- 22 August – Sites located at Boon Tiong Road and Tiong Bahru Road were selected for the first SERS project.
- 25 August – SAFTI Military Institute was officially opened in Jurong West.
- 30 August – The Singapore International Convention and Exhibition Centre (now Suntec) was officially opened.

=== September ===
- 1 September –
  - Plans for a new arts radio station were announced at the launch of Prime 12 and Premiere 12.
  - The Land Transport Authority was established to develop the land transport system in Singapore.
  - The National Library Board was established to improve libraries in Singapore.
  - The prefix '9' was added to all mobile numbers.
  - A new six-digit postal code system took effect, replacing the four-digit system used since 1979.
- 5 September –
  - Pacific Internet began operations as Singapore's second ISP, after acquiring TechNet on 19 June.
  - Cyberway Internet was granted an ISP licence, making it Singapore's third Internet operator.
- 8 September – Parco Bugis Junction was opened to the public.

=== October ===
- 1 October – The Public Utilities Board was reconstituted, resulting in the setting up of Singapore Power (now SP Group).
- 20 October – The National Orchid Garden was officially opened.

=== November ===
- 2 November – Parliament passed the Maintenance of Parents Act, a private member's bill introduced by Woon Cheong Ming Walter.
- 5 November – The second phase of the Seletar Expressway was opened.
- 10 November – Tanah Merah Ferry Terminal was officially opened to enhance ferry links.
- 25 November – Century Square was officially opened.

=== December ===
- 7 December – Jurong Point was opened to the public.
- 29 December – Nanook the polar bear (of Singapore Zoo) died at the age of 18.

== Births ==
- 28 January – He Yingying, Mediacorp actress
- 16 June – Joseph Schooling, swimmer.
- 17 June - Chantalle Ng, Mediacorp TV actress
- 22 June - Amanda Germaine Lee, MADDSpace Senior Vocal Coach.
- 7 August – Kimberly Chia, actress.
- 6 September – Seow Sin Nee, actress and host.
- 14 December - Yung Raja, Singaporean Tamil rapper, television actor.

== Deaths ==
- 11 June – Ang Chwee Chai, pioneer of photography (b. 1910).
- 17 June – Julie Tan, women's rights activist and 1st President of the Singapore Council of Women's Organisation (b. 1930).
- 22 August – Jacen T. Hsieh, Dean of the College of Commerce and former Secretary of Nanyang University Council (b. 1908).
- 1 September – Ye Fong, comedian (b. 1932).
- 20 September – Chiou Sin Min, prominent figure in Singaporean education and Southeast Asian history (b. 1914).
- 4 October – Eu Chooi Yip, prominent leader of the Malayan Communist Party in Singapore (b. 1918).
- 8 October – Sanusi Mahmood, 1st Mufti of Singapore (b. 1909).
- 11 October – Ho Yew Ming, PAP grassroots leader, tipped to run as PAP candidate for Bukit Gombak SMC (b. 1950).
- 26 October – Moh Siew Meng, former Chief Executive Officer of Housing and Development Board (b. 1947).
- 9 November – H. F. G. Leembruggen, civil servant and diplomat (b. 1925).
- 12 December – David Marshall, 1st Chief Minister of Singapore (b. 1908).
- 16 December – Anthony Then, pioneer of dance (b. 1944).
