= Chia Keng Hock =

Singaporean footballer

Keng Hock
Personal information
- Full name: John Chia Keng Hock
- Date of birth: 1911
- Place of birth: Singapore
- Date of death: 1 December 1993 (aged 81–82)
- Place of death: Singapore
- Position: Forward

Youth career
- 1930-1932: St Joseph’s Institution (SJI)

Senior career*
Years	Team	Apps	(Gls)
1931-1947	SCFA	64	(99)
1933-1934	Fraser & Neave	1	(3)
1933-1935	Companions AA	8	(23)
Total		73	(125)

International career
1931-1942	Singapore	23	(37)
- * Club domestic league appearances and goals

Chia Keng Hock (1913–1 December 1993) was a Singaporean footballer who played as a striker.

== Club career ==
Hock made his debut for SCFA in 1931, the following year, SCFA toured China and Hock was regarded by the media in Shanghai as “the best of the visiting strikers". The SCFA side came second in the 1933 Singapore Championship, with Hock scoring 26 goals in 11 games. 1934 saw SCFA top the Singapore championship for the first time, with Hock being the forerunner of their incredible campaign. (Note: Statistics may be increased)

In 1935, Hock was part of a Malayan Chinese side that participated in the 6th All-China Olympiad in Shanghai. He scored five goals in his first match and four in his second as Malayan Chinese cruised past Liaoning 9–1, and Zhejiang 12–0. Malayan Chinese went on to beat Shanghai 3–1 before losing 3–2 in the final to Hong Kong.

== International career ==
Chia played for Singapore in the Malaya Cup.

== Personal life ==
In 1935, Keng Hock was awoken by a drunk Japanese man before midnight, on 23 January. The man was at a party and cut his hand on broken glass. He got freaked out with this occurrence and through an opening of Hock's window, the man entered into his room. Hock, without wanting to take the law into his own hands, walked out of his room, and went to get a constable. The man was charged $1 for pleading guilty for being drunk and disorderly.
