= Underwater World, Singapore =

Former oceanarium in Singapore

Underwater World

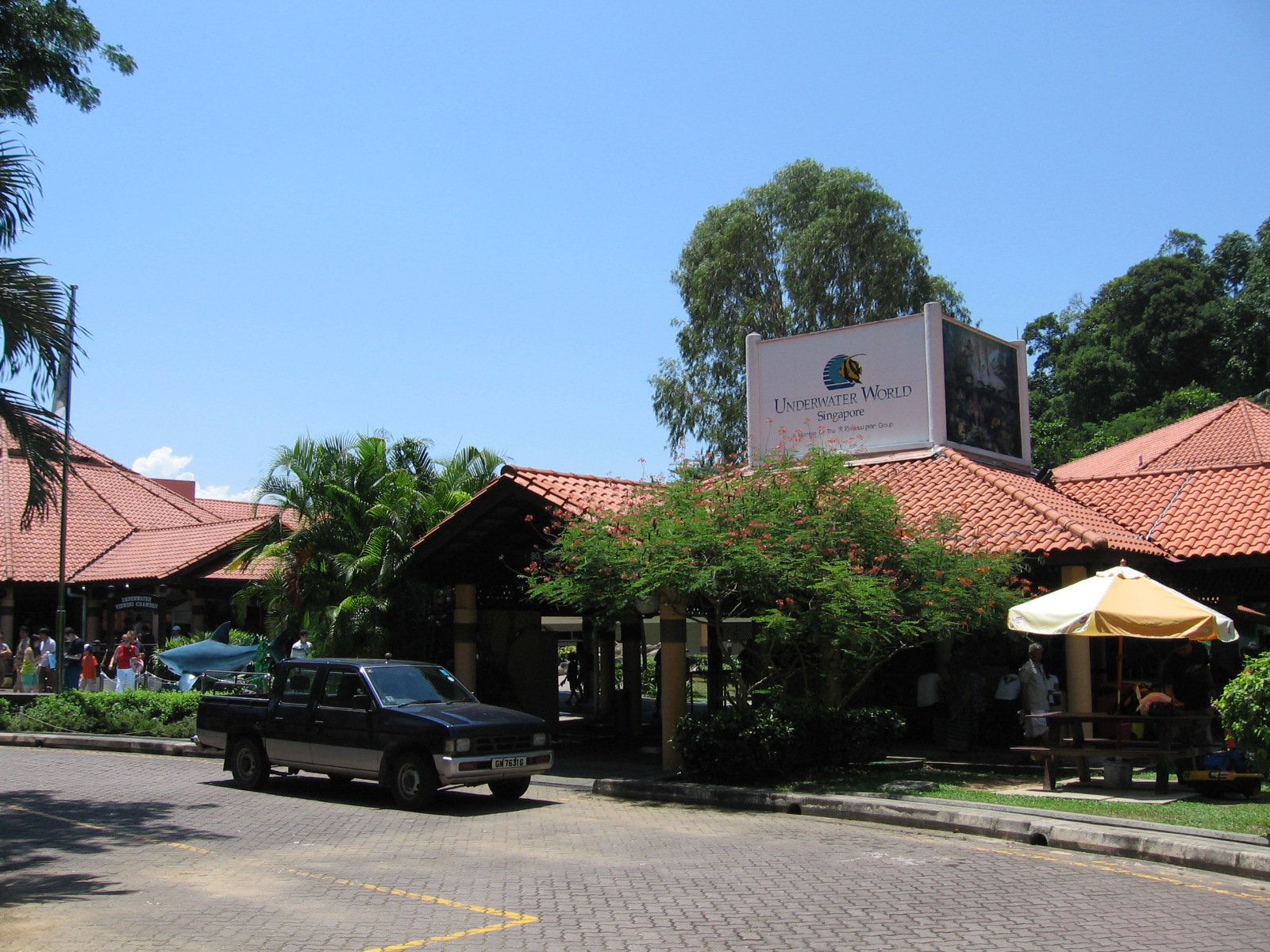
- Entrance to Underwater World, 2006
- Interactive map of Underwater World
- 1.2586°N 103.8112°E
- Date opened: 13 May 1991; 35 years ago
- Date closed: 26 June 2016; 10 years ago
- Location: 80 Siloso Road; Singapore 098969
- Land area: 28 hectares (69 acres)
- No. of animals: 2500
- No. of species: 250
- Major exhibits: Aquatic Creatures
- Website: http://www.underwaterworld.com.sg/

Underwater World, also known as Underwater World Singapore Pte Ltd, was an oceanarium located on the offshore Singaporean island of Sentosa. It was opened on 13 May 1991 and closed on 26 June 2016.

== History ==
The oceanarium was developed by the Western Australian Development Corporation in the late 1980s. It opened to the public on 13 May 1991 and was sold to private investors a year later. It had more than 2,500 marine animals of 250 species from different regions of the world. The oceanarium was mostly underground and it was owned by the Haw Par Corporation. The Underwater World's ticket included admission to the Dolphin Lagoon at Palawan Beach. It re-opened on 23 February 2010 after a revamp of several attractions within the park.

In August 2014 the organizations Wildlife Watcher Singapore, in collaboration with Sea Shepherd Conservation Society, reported sub-standard living conditions for the animals.

The pink dolphins have since been rehoused in Chimelong Ocean Kingdom, an oceanarium in Zhuhai, China.

== Closure ==
On 6 June 2016, it was announced by operator Haw Par that the venue would close on 26th of that month. Its pink dolphins, fur seals and otters had been transferred to Chimelong Ocean Kingdom in Zhuhai, China the week before the announcement.

== See also ==
- Jurong Bird Park
- Marine Life Park
- Singapore Zoo
- Van Kleef Aquarium
