= Singapore Gamma Knife Centre =

Hospital in Singapore specialising in radiosurgery

Coordinates: 1.3221°N 103.8440°E

The Singapore Gamma Knife Centre is a medical facility specialising in gamma knife radiosurgery.

== History ==
Construction of the Singapore Gamma Knife Centre was funded by the Health Corporation of Singapore (HCS) and the Singapore Technologies Precision Engineering (STPE). The project was the first of its kind in Southeast Asia, and the budget totalled to around ten million dollars. The centre's official opening ceremony was held on 5 March 1996, although surgeries at the centre only began on 27 November 1996. (Note: The centre's official website erroneously gives the date as 27 November 1995. This would have been before the centre even opened.) As it did not involve incision of the brain, the public welcomed the introduction of gamma knife radiosurgery to Singapore.

== Operations ==
The facility is based in the Balestier Road-based ParkwayHealth Day Surgery & Medical Centre. An independent medical centre, any member of the public, local or foreigner, is entitled to make use of it. The centre promotes itself as "Asia's leading gamma knife centre" and "the only gamma knife facility in Singapore".
