= 1996 Pacific Plaza stabbing =

1996 murder of an Indonesian businessman in Singapore

Benny Probocemdana Oen
- Born: Benny Probocemdana Oen; 1958; Medan, Indonesia
- Died: 23 May 1996 (aged 38); Orchard Road, Singapore
- Cause of death: Murdered
- Other name: Huang Han Ming
- Occupation: Businessman (former)
- Known for: Murder victim

On 23 May 1996, a 38-year-old Indonesian businessman named Benny Probocemdana Oen (Chinese: 黄汉明; pinyin: Huáng Hànmíng; Pe̍h-ōe-jī: N̂g Hàn-bêng) was mortally wounded by an assailant during a stabbing incident at Pacific Plaza before he died in hospital. The suspect, identified as 19-year-old Sim Eng Teck (Chinese: 沈英德; pinyin: Shěn Yīngdé; Pe̍h-ōe-jī: Sím Eng-tek), was arrested more than a year later and charged with murder. Sim put up a defence of alcohol intoxication and put forward claims that he only intended to stab the victim's arm during the attack. However, Judicial Commissioner Amerjeet Singh found that Sim had intentionally inflicted the fatal injuries on Oen and described the killing as a "daringly cold-blooded" murder, and sentenced Sim to death in May 1998. Sim lost his appeal on 1 August 1998, and was hanged afterwards.

== Murder ==
On 23 May 1996, at around 3 am, after a hangout, Tio Seng Khun (Chinese: 张成坤; pinyin: Zhāng Chéngkūn; Pe̍h-ōe-jī: Tiuⁿ Sêng-khun; alias Herman Susantio), a Chinese-Indonesian, discovered his 38-year-old friend Benny Probocemdana Oen (alias Huang Han Ming 黄汉明) on the ground, bleeding from his neck. According to him, Oen, who was a Chinese-Indonesian from Medan and a businessman with dealings in Singapore, Indonesia and Malaysia, went to the location (3m away from Tio) to take a phone call while waiting for a car outside the discotheque (where Oen and Tio hung out with their other friends) at Pacific Plaza, where they both frequented. Tio also witnessed two men leaving the scene on a vehicle, and they were presumed to be the ones attacking Oen earlier on. Oen was pronounced dead at Singapore General Hospital at 3.50 am, shortly after he arrived for medical treatment.

Oen's friends who settled in Singapore noted that Oen was single and he was good-tempered and soft-spoken, and never caused any trouble. It was also speculated by witnesses that the phone call received by Oen before he was stabbed might be a ploy to lure him to a spot where he could be easily attacked, but it was verified that the phone call came from Oen's Malaysian girlfriend, who had a good relationship with him. Tio also told the authorities that prior to losing consciousness on the way to hospital, Oen stated that he recognised the attacker, and Oen said he would settle scores with the killer, whose name he reportedly did not remember.

Forensic pathologist Dr Gilbert Lau examined the corpse and found that there was a 15 cm long knife wound on the back of his neck, which cut through one of his ears and a blood artery, resulting in Oen's death from acute haemorrhage. Dr Lau also stated that there were at least two more knife wounds, one that nearly amputated Oen's left palm and another that cut through the shoulder of the victim, who was stabbed by a heavy but sharp object. A finger of Oen was also believed to be chopped off due to him warding off the blows of his attacker.

== Arrest of Sim Eng Teck ==
The police classified the stabbing incident as murder, and they conducted investigations to trace the possible suspects behind the murder of Benny Probocemdana Oen, who was said to have a monetary dispute with another person before he was killed. They suspected that the crime had to do with Thai and/or Malaysian crime syndicates, based on the manner of the attack and possible murder weapons used (like a machete). Subsequently, the police managed to identify one suspect, who was a 19-year-old Singaporean named Sim Eng Teck (alias Suay Teck), who was born on 2 February 1977, unemployed and lived at Bukit Batok. In October 1996, five months after the brutal stabbing, Singaporean crime show Crimewatch broadcast its episode and sent a public appeal to audiences, seeking information in relation to Sim's whereabouts and asked the public to come forward with details that could assist the authorities to arrest Sim.

Ten months later, the Royal Malaysia Police arrested Sim Eng Teck at Johor Bahru, Malaysia on 11 March 1997. He was soon extradited back to Singapore for trial. The Singapore Police Force cited the case in July 1997 as an example of the close ties and cooperation between the police officers of both countries and thanked the Malaysian counterparts during a liaison meeting between the two countries' police forces.

== Trial proceedings ==
On 12 May 1998, Sim Eng Teck stood trial at the High Court for the murder of Benny Probocemdana Oen. Judicial Commissioner Amarjeet Singh presided the hearing, and Sim was represented by Tan Teow Yeow, while R. D. Gangatharan was the trial prosecutor of the case.

According to Sim's version of events, he stated that he used to meet up with Oen at the disco, where the businessman sold him Ecstasy pills. However, Sim fell out with Oen after he discovered that the pills he bought from Oen were fake. Another reason of Sim falling out with Oen was due to Oen refusing to return him a sum of SGD$500, which Sim lent him two or three weeks prior to the murder. Also, Sim testified that on the day of the killing, he decided to teach Oen a lesson out of anger over their personal disputes, and thus bought a knife to attack Oen. However, Sim claimed he never wanted to cause Oen's death, and he only wanted to stab Oen on the left arm. He also put up a second defence of alcohol intoxication, since his prior intake of four to five tequilas before the killing had substantially caused him to lose control of his mental faculties at the time of the murder, as what his defence counsel argued in court.

A week later, on 19 May 1998, Judicial Commissioner Singh delivered his verdict. The judge rejected Sim's contention that he was intoxicated with alcohol at the time he killed Oen, since Sim was able to act normally in spite of his intake of four to five tequilas. He also rejected Sim's defence that he only intend to stab Oen on the arm but nothing else, because he never mentioned this part in his first version of events regarding the stabbing, and found it to be an afterthought concocted to downplay his culpability.

Judicial Commissioner Singh also found that Sim intentionally stabbed the victim, such that one of the injuries were sufficient to cause death in the ordinary course of nature, and this was done out of Sim's hatred against Oen for their personal issues. The judge pointed out that even if it was true that Sim only intend to cause hurt to Oen, it would be enough to just inflict one blow rather than several blows, and in conclusion, he described the killing of Oen as a "daringly cold-blooded murder". Hence, 21-year-old Sim Eng Teck was found guilty of murder, and sentenced to death.

== Aftermath ==
In the aftermath of his murder trial, Sim Eng Teck appealed his conviction and sentence, in a bid to escape the gallows and hoping that his trial defence could be accepted by the appellate court.

However, on 1 August 1998, the Court of Appeal dismissed Sim's appeal and therefore upheld his conviction and sentence. The three judges - Lai Kew Chai, L P Thean and M Karthigesu - were of the opinion that the trial judge's findings were correct in coming to the conclusion that Sim had committed murder by intentionally inflicting the fatal injury on Benny Probocemdana Oen, and also affirmed the trial judge's finding of Sim's motive behind the attack. Justice Karthigesu, who delivered the verdict of the three-judge panel, pointed out that in view of the forensic evidence, they accepted that a considerable amount of force had been exerted by Sim when he used the knife to cause hurt to Oen, which were indicative of Sim's intention to cause lethal harm to Oen and in turn, resulting in his death.

Since the loss of his appeal, Sim Eng Teck was eventually hanged at Changi Prison.

== See also ==
- Capital punishment in Singapore
