= Singapore Malay Chamber of Commerce and Industry =

Chamber of commerce and industry

- Formation: 1956; 70 years ago
- Founded at: Singapore
- Type: Chamber of commerce
- Purpose: To nurture a vibrant entrepreneurial culture amongst Malay/Muslim Enterprises
- Location: 15 Jalan Pinang, Singapore
- Members: 400 members
- President: Dr Abdul Malik Hassan
- Website: www.smcci.org.sg
- Formerly called: Singapore Malay Chamber of Commerce (SMCC)

The Singapore Malay Chamber of Commerce and Industry (SMCCI) is a non-profit organization, established in 1956 to represent and support the Malay/Muslim business community in Singapore.

== History ==
The Singapore Malay Chamber of Commerce (SMCC) was first established in 1956 as by a group of Malay/Muslim businessmen, including the first President of Singapore, Yusof Ishak. The SMCC was set up in an effort to look after the trading interests of the Malay/Muslim business community. It started out with only 15 companies, with their first office located at 500 Victoria Street.

In 1988, the SMCC's office was relocated to International Plaza.

In 1995, it was renamed to SMCCI to reflect its wider scope.

The SMCCI's office was relocated to 72A Bussorah Street.

In 2006, SME Centre @ SMCCI was established as a one-stop centre for local small and medium enterprises (SMEs).

In 2009, the SMCCI's office was again relocated to 15 Jalan Pinang.

In 2016, The SMCCI celebrated its 60th anniversary and backed the setting up of a global hub along with SPRING Singapore and International Enterprise Singapore which would identify food firms scale up their halal exports.

In 2018, The SMCCI collaborated with Enterprise Singapore and One Kampong Glam Association in a project led by Infocomm Media Development Authority to digitalize businesses within the Kampong Glam vicinity.

In 2021, SMCCI established an office at 35 Onan Rd in the heart of Geylang Serai.

== List of Presidents ==
- 1956-1960 – Mr Haji Abdul Hamid Allwie
- 1963-1966 – Mr Salleh Basharahil
- 1968-1969 – Mr Zainal Haji Alias
- 1970-1980 – Mr Mohd Ghazali Gaffoor
- 1980-1984, 1988-1992, 1994-1998 – Mr Haji Abdul Jalil Bin Haron
- 1984-1988 – Mr Syed Ali Redha Alsagoff
- 1992-1994 – Mr Jamil Marican
- 1999-2003 – Mr Umar Abdul Hamid
- 2003-2005 – Ms Nooraini Noordin
- 2005-2009 – Dato' Mohd Zain Abdullah
- 2009-2013 – Mr Abdul Rohim Sarip
- 2013-2017 – Mr Zahidi Abdul Rahman
- 2017-2019 – Mr Shamir Rahim
- 2019-2023 – Mr Farid Khan
- 2023-2025 – Mr Abu Bakar Mohd Nor
- 2025-Current – Dr Abdul Malik Hassan

== Functions and activities ==
Since its establishment, SMCCI has played an active role in the facilitation of its members’ trade activities and acts as a point of contact between local and international sellers and consumers.

SMCCI collates information on business opportunities and disseminates it among its members. Like other recognised chambers of commerce, SMCCI is authorised to endorse certificates of origin as needed by exporters.

Today, SMCCI continues to work in representing the interests of the local Malay/Muslim business community and serves as a platform to create opportunities for members through regular business missions, conferences, networking sessions and activities. Now, with its subsidiary, SME Centre@SMCCI, works to strengthen capabilities and encourage local SMEs to adopt technologies and expand their business overseas.

Since 2010, SMCCI has been hosting Malay/Muslim Business Conference for sharing industry knowledge and expertise with the participation of successful Malay/Muslim entrepreneurs. In 2014, Prime minister Lee Hsien Loong and Yaacob Ibrahim, the Minister for Communications and Information attended the event as the Guest of Honor and gave a speech at the conference.

== See also ==
- Singapore Business Federation
- Singapore Chinese Chamber of Commerce and Industry
