= Corrective Work Order =

Punishment in Singapore

The Corrective Work Order, commonly known as CWO, is a Singaporean punishment meted out to "litterbugs". It went into effect on 1 November 1992 as a second, harsher penalty for littering in the country, with the older one being a fine. Initially the two were mutually exclusive, but in 1997 the government felt it was not a sufficient deterrent, so it decided that they could be combined.

The CWO was created through an amendment of the Environment Public Health Act on November 1992. It is meted out to serious or repeat offenders who are at least 16 years old. The order forces litterbugs to clean up a public location for several hours under supervision, while wearing a bright green luminous vest bearing the words "Corrective Work Order".

The most common offenders are males between the ages of 18 and 35, and the most common item of litter is a cigarette butt.

Initially littering offenses significantly dropped, and there were very few repeat offenders. Offences dropped from 432 a month in 1990, pre-CWO, to 349 (around 4188 for the entire year) in 1994. However, an annual total of 5707 in 1995 rose to 7790 the following year. By 1997 the government had become dissatisfied with its deterrence value and made it possible to combine a CWO with a fine; in 2015 one man was fined $19,000 and sentenced to a CWO. It also increased the maximum number of CWO hours of work from 3 to 12. More recently, from 2017 to 2021, the National Environment Agency issued an average of 27,200 tickets and 10,200 CWOs a year.
