= Zena Tessensohn =

Singaporean sports official

Zena Denise Clarke Tessensohn (16 December 1909 – 25 July 1991) was a Singaporean sports official. She was one of the Girls' Sports Club's founders. In 2018 she was inducted into the Singapore Women's Hall of Fame.
