= 1996 Bedok Reservoir flat murder =

1996 murder case in Singapore

Murder of Neo Lam Lye
- Date: 28 August 1996; 29 years ago
- Location: Bedok, Singapore
- Motive: To prevent secret of affair from being exposed
- Deaths: 1
- Suspects: Jimmy Chua Hwa Soon

On 26 August 1996, at a flat in Bedok Reservoir Road, 25-year-old Jimmy Chua Hwa Soon (Chinese: 蔡华顺; pinyin: Cài Huáshùn; Pe̍h-ōe-jī: Chhòa Hôa-sūn), an army sergeant of the Singapore Armed Forces (SAF), brutally slashed his 39-year-old sister-in-law Neo Lam Lye (Chinese: 梁南莱; pinyin: Liáng Nánlái; Pe̍h-ōe-jī: Niô͘ Lâm-lâi) and four-year-old nephew. While the boy survived the attack, Neo died as a result of 109 stab and slash wounds on her body. Chua was arrested five hours after the cruel attack, and he admitted to the killing, revealing that he had an affair with Neo ten years prior to the murder. Although Chua put up a defence of diminished responsibility against the charges of attempted murder and murder, the High Court found him guilty of murder and sentenced him to death. The Court of Appeal's subsequent ruling of Chua's case became a notable legal case report which emphasized on the requirements to find a person liable to the defence of diminished responsibility against a criminal charge in Singapore.

== Case and arrest ==
On the afternoon of 26 August 1996, several residents (including a ten-year-old schoolboy) of a HDB block located at Bedok Reservoir Road were shocked to see a man running out of one of the units, with his clothes stained in blood and had injuries on his hands. The man, who was dressed in a military uniform, rushed down the stairs and reached a carpark, where he drove a car to leave the neighbourhood. Prior to that, two of the nearby residents witnessed a man assaulting a woman near the kitchen window and heard screams of a woman and a child from that same flat. Later, after the man left, two neighbours went near the flat to investigate what happened, and found bloodstains nearby the staircase and a trail of blood outside the flat. It led to the neighbours contacting the police.

By the time the police arrived, a 17-year-old girl, who lived in the flat with her mother and two brothers, arrived back home at the flat, where several police officers and residents were gathering outside the flat. After the girl opened the door and allowed the officers in, they discovered her four-year-old youngest brother and their 39-year-old mother Neo Lam Lye lying on the bedroom floor with knife wounds all over their bodies. The boy was still alive, but Neo was dead by the time she was found. The boy sustained multiple slash wounds at his skull, face, shoulders, and arms, while Neo had a total of 109 knife wounds, including two stab wounds that went right through the mouth.

After first-hand inquiries and investigations, the police deduced that the suspected killer was someone known to Neo and that Neo had a brother-in-law who was in the army. Concluding the brother-in-law as the prime suspect, the police thus laid an ambush near Neo's flat, where the crime scene was cordoned off. Five hours later, in the evening, the brother-in-law, 25-year-old Jimmy Chua Hwa Soon, who was an army sergeant of the Singapore Armed Forces (SAF), approached near the crime scene and behaved suspiciously. The police quickly closed in on him and placed him under arrest.

During interrogation, Chua, who was found to have injuries on his hand, confessed that he was the one responsible for Neo's alleged murder but denied slashing his nephew. He also admitted he had an affair with Neo at age 15 and had argued with Neo over him not wanting to continue the affair before the murder. Nonetheless, on 28 August 1996, Chua was charged with murder in relation to Neo's death, and faced a second charge of attempted murder for attacking his nephew on 2 October 1996. Although his name was revealed publicly, the survivor's name (as well as his sister's) was redacted from subsequent news reports to protect his identity since he was a minor at the time of the offences. Also, Chua was not the only person in his family to face criminal charges, as among his eight elder siblings, one of his sisters was jailed six years for cheating.

== Trial and sentencing ==
=== Cases of the prosecution and defence ===
On 17 March 1997, 26-year-old Jimmy Chua claimed trial to the charges of murder and attempted murder at the High Court. The presiding judge of the case was T. S. Sinnathuray, the same judge who passed the death sentence on notorious child killer Adrian Lim (and his two holy wives) back in 1983 and British serial killer John Martin Scripps back in 1995. Kow Keng Siong led the prosecution while Ismail Hamid represented Chua as his lawyer.

Initially, Chua only admitted to slashing Neo Lam Lye but not the attack on his nephew, claiming that after he argued with Neo and telling her he did not want to restart their affair, Neo attacked him with a knife but the blows were inflicted on the boy instead during the struggle between Chua and Neo. However, after the nephew told the police and court that it was Chua who attacked him and his mother, Chua subsequently admitted to being the one attacking his nephew.

In midst of the trial, Chua manifested deep remorse for committing the murder and sought forgiveness from his family, who got to know about his previous affair with Neo. Chua's Malaysian wife Tang Li Ming (aged 27 in 1997), with whom Chua bore a daughter, reportedly forgave her husband despite her shock over the past affair between her husband and Neo. Also, Neo's daughter did not blame Chua or his wife despite the fact that her mother died at the hands of Chua, and in fact, both she and Tang bonded more closely than before as a result of their distress over the case.

After Neo's neighbours and the other witnesses finished making their testimonies in court, Chua went to the stand to give his defence. Chua said that on the night of 25 August 1996, the day before the murder, he was doing his usual 24-hour duty at the army camp. Three hours before his duty came to an end, he had consumed slimming pills to suppress his appetite and stay awake, which he usually did whenever he was on 24-hour duty. The consumption of these tablets also adversely affect his temper sometimes. After the end of his duty, he went to his brother's flat at Bedok Reservoir Road to borrow money to buy a ring for his wife, since he had financial problems. However, his brother was away overseas for work and thus only Neo and her youngest son was present. The day Chua murdered Neo happened to be the same date of his second wedding anniversary.

At the flat, after she gave Chua S$1,000, Neo expressed her intention to once again having an affair with Chua. Chua told the court that he reminded his sister-in-law that he was married and their affair was already over two years ago. He professed his love for his wife and daughter and wanted to leave the flat to go back home and celebrate their wedding anniversary. However, Neo threatened to tell his wife and their family about the affair and the first sexual encounter she had with Chua when he was 18. Chua claimed he went to the kitchen to have a drink due to his exhaustion over the duty and Neo's threats. Right at that point, according to Chua, he saw a hallucination of Neo, whose face changed into that of a terrifying long-tongued ghost, holding a knife and attacking him. It led to Chua restraining the "female ghost" and tied her up with a telephone cord inside Neo's bedroom.

After doing so, Chua claimed he heard a voice inside his head, telling him to chop the "ghost", who was actually Neo. Chua thus obeyed the voice and used a chopper to slash and stab at the "ghost", and as a result, 39-year-old Neo Lam Lye died from the frenzied attack. Chua said that after the attack on the "ghost", he saw a hallucination of his nephew resembling a little ghost with a smile, and the voice in his head ordered him to chop the boy, thus leading to the relentless attack on the boy. Defence psychiatrist R Nagulendran submitted a report that Chua was suffering from a psychotic disorder and psychosis of the mind that led to him hallucinating and hearing voices in his head at the time of the murder. Chua additionally mentioned in the trial that the news of his affair would devastate his family if exposed.

However, the prosecution rebutted that Chua knew all along that the two "ghosts" he slashed were actually Neo and her son, and that he was not actually not under the control of supposed voices inside his mind. They instead presented that Chua had every reason to kill Neo and her son to avoid the secret of his past affair from becoming public knowledge to his wife and family. Chua denied that he did the killing out of hatred, and insisted he had no reason to murder Neo or mutilate her body at all.

The prosecution's psychiatrist, Dr Chan Kim Yew, testified for the prosecution that Chua was pretending to be mad and did not suffer from any insanity at all. He cited a case study, which slated that five out of nine patients who were under the control of voices only obeyed if they recognized the voice, and yet Chua said the ghost giving him the orders was faceless and unrecognizable, which showed that Chua was faking his supposed madness.

=== Judgement ===
On 14 April 1997, Justice Sinnathuray delivered his verdict. He described the murder of Neo as one of the most horrific murder cases he ever came across in his legal career as a judge. He concluded that Chua was not suffering from insanity or being under control of voices at the time he committed the offences charged, and had full control of his mental faculties at the time he killed Neo. He also determined that Chua had killed Neo as a result of the hatred and contempt he had towards Neo. Having rejected Chua's defence of diminished responsibility, Justice Sinnathuray therefore found Chua guilty of the murder of Neo and the attempted murder of his nephew.

As a result, Chua was sentenced to death for murdering his sister-in-law, and he also received the maximum term of life imprisonment for the attempted murder of his nephew. However, since Chua also received the harsher sentence of death, his life sentence was ordered to be suspended as long as his death penalty was still in effect, and Chua was hence incarcerated on death row at Changi Prison. Neo's younger brother commented to the media after the verdict's disclosure, "A life for a life." Chua's wife also planned to write to the President of Singapore for clemency.

== Appeal and execution ==
Initially, after Jimmy Chua's trial, his family members were hesitant over whether or not to file an appeal against Chua's death sentence. Later, they made a public apology to Chua's eldest brother and went ahead with Chua's appeal. It was reported that Chua's eldest brother only received news of his wife's death after Chua was sentenced to death, and with distraught, he could not accept the news of his wife's murder.

After hearing the appeal, Chief Justice Yong Pung How and two other judges dismissed the appeal on 9 February 1998, and their judgement was released on 3 March 1998. The judges agreed that Chua was not suffering from any abnormality of mind during the course of the killing, and he had the ability to regain control of himself even if he did hear voices in his mind telling him to kill Neo Lam Lye and the nephew. Chief Justice Yong commented that Chua was not mad, but in essence a "bad" person for having inflicted such a malicious and sadistic attack on a defenceless young boy and the boy's own mother for the sake of covering up his illicit affair.

The three judges also emphasised on using the three-tier test to determine whether a person was indeed suffering diminished responsibility, which consist of the "abnormality of mind" limb, "cause" limb and "substantial impairment" limb, and having applied the test, they decided that in the aftermath of the killing, Chua had the consciousness of tying up the victim, disposing of his bloodstained clothes, looking for his keys to open the door and putting on his army boots before running etc., which were signs of Chua's mind being "not substantially impaired as to absolve him of mental responsibility for his foul crime." For these above reasons, the appeal of Jimmy Chua was thereby rejected.

Amnesty International received news of the dismissal of Chua's appeal, and in April 1998, they appealed to the Government of Singapore for clemency on behalf of Chua. They cited Chua's remorse and the fact his family forgave him as factors to commute Chua's sentence to life imprisonment, and it was slated that the deadline for Chua to submit his clemency petition was on 23 May 1998. Despite the international plea, 27-year-old Jimmy Chua Hwa Soon was eventually hanged in 1998.

== Aftermath of case ==
Singaporean crime show True Files re-adapted and featured the case of Jimmy Chua's trial. It first aired as the tenth episode of the show's third season on 27 December 2004. In the episode, the names of Chua, his victims and family had their names changed to protect the identities and privacy of their surviving family members: Chua's name was changed to David Chia, Neo Lam Lye's name was changed to Linda Wong and Chua's nephew's name was changed to Brian Chia. Both Chua's former lawyer Ismail Hamid and defence psychiatrist R Nagulendran were interviewed by the show's producers about the case. In the interview, Ismail stated that Chua was remorseful of killing Neo and regretted the humiliation and hardship he brought upon his family, while Dr Nagulendran stated that he still stood by his opinion that Chua was indeed suffering from a psychosis of the mind and if he was normal, he would not have gone as far as to inflict such a vicious attack on Neo and her son.

The appeal ruling in Chua's case, titled Chua Hwa Soon Jimmy v Public Prosecutor, was listed as one of the notable legal cases which touched on the concept of the use of defence of diminished responsibility against a criminal charge in Singapore.

== See also ==
- Capital punishment in Singapore
- List of major crimes in Singapore
