= Rolex watch murder =

1998 robbery-murder in Singapore

- Date: 20 April 1998; 28 years ago
- Location: Marina South, Central, Singapore
- Motive: To rob the Rolex watch for girlfriend as a birthday present
- Deaths: Sally Poh Bee Eng
- Suspects: Jonaris Badlishah
- Verdict: found guilty of murder and sentenced to death at 8 December 1998; Jonaris was hanged at 24 February 1999
- Convictions: Murder
- Sentence: Death

In the early morning hours of 20 April 1998, in Marina South, Central, Singapore, a 23-year-old Malaysian named Jonaris Badlishah, who was the nephew of the Sultan of Kedah, brutally murdered 42-year-old beautician Sally Poh Bee Eng (Chinese: 傅美英; pinyin: Fù Měiyīng; Pe̍h-ōe-jī: Pò͘ Bí-eng) (Note: Also with alternative Chinese name Chinese: 蒲良旭; pinyin: Pú Liángxù; Pe̍h-ōe-jī: Phô͘ Liâng-hiok) in order to rob her of her Rolex watch, which he wanted to give to his girlfriend as a birthday present. He was said to have used a hammer to hit her on the head more than ten times before robbing her, leading to Poh to die from her skull fractures. He also slit her wrists to make sure she would die. Following police investigations, Jonaris was arrested three days later and charged with murder.

The Rolex watch which Jonaris Badlishah stole from Sally Poh after murdering her

In his trial, Jonaris pled the murder charge with a defence of diminished responsibility, claiming that he was depressed, intoxicated with drugs and heard voices telling him to kill the victim. The psychiatric experts from the prosecution, however, assessed him and found him to be normal and not suffering from any abnormality of the mind when he killed Poh. Hence, Jonaris was found guilty of murder and sentenced to death in December 1998. He was hanged in 24 February 1999 after losing his appeal.

== Murder investigation ==
Sally Poh Bee Eng, the beautician who was found dead near Marina South

On 20 April 1998, in a forest near Marina South bus stop, a passerby discovered the corpse of a woman among the vegetation, and the female's belongings were found at the bus stop. The victim was later identified as 42-year-old Sally Poh Bee Eng, who was a beautician and make-up artist for low budget films. At the time of her death, Poh was married to a 47-year-old teacher Lee Boon Siang (Chinese: 李文祥; pinyin: Lǐ Wénxiáng; Pe̍h-ōe-jī: Lí Bûn-siâng), and they had two grown-up children, a son and daughter. The police found that some of her valuables were missing, including a Rolex watch, which was bought by her husband three years prior to her murder.

According to Poh's husband, he overheard his wife speaking on the telephone the day before the murder, speaking to a man about an early morning appointment. Lee said that the man's name was "Lai Joe", from what he heard. Using the name, police later investigated and discovered there was a 23-year-old man who happened to have a nickname called "Liar Joe", which sounds similar to "Lai Joe".

"Liar Joe", whose real name was Jonaris Badlishah, was arrested as a suspect three days after the murder. On the day of the murder, he had given his 31-year-old girlfriend, Saifon Ngammoo, a Rolex watch as a birthday present, which was later confirmed to be the missing watch that Poh wore before her death. Jonaris, whose full name was actually Tengku Jonaris Badlishah bin Tengku Abdul Hamid Thani due to him being the nephew of the then Sultan of Kedah (which made him also known as "Tengku Jonaris Badlishah" in both Singaporean and Malaysian newspapers), was charged with murder.

== Trial ==
On 28 October 1998, Jonaris, then 23 years old, stood trial in the High Court of Singapore for the robbery and murder of Poh. He was defended by lawyer Peter Fernando and Deputy Public Prosecutor (DPP) Jasbendar Kaur of the Attorney-General's Chambers led the prosecution. Jonaris was often dressed smartly in his court appearances, and his case was highly publicized given his status as a prince and the nature of his crime.

=== Prosecution's case ===
Professor Chao Tzee Cheng, the forensic pathologist who conducted an autopsy on Poh, testified that he found extensive fractures on the left side of Poh's skull. The longest crack on her head measured about 13 cm long. He said that these fractures were fatal and that even if she had received medical help at the scene, doctors would not have been able to revive her. He said these fractures could be inflicted by a blunt instrument and from behind, taking the victim by surprise. Professor Chao said he found slash wounds on her wrists, which might have been inflicted to ensure that Poh would die even if the skull fractures did not kill her; in fact, she was already dead by the time her wrists were cut.

The prosecution, in their case, claimed that Jonaris had in fact premeditated the murder and wanted to kill Poh to rob her of her Rolex watch in order to give it as a birthday present to Saifon. It was revealed in court that Jonaris first met Poh on 18 April 1998, and having seen her wearing a Rolex watch, he decided to rob her, and thus on 19 April, the day before the killing, Jonaris telephoned Poh and arranged to meet her early in the morning the next day for a photoshoot, requiring her services. In the phone call, Jonaris introduced himself as "Nigel", which Poh and Lee misheard as "Lai Joe" (which ironically, and indirectly linked him to his "Liar Joe" nickname and led to his capture).

On the day of the murder, at around 6.30 am, Poh arrived at the Marina South bus stop, opposite the Superbowl Golf and Country Club, and she met Jonaris, who told her that "Nigel" and the crew would be arriving later in a short time. After parking her car, both Poh and Jonaris waited at the bus stop; it was there when Jonaris took out a hammer and struck the woman on the head, before he dragged her unconscious body to the bushes behind the bus stop and moved about 10 metres (yards) away from the area. At that point, Poh regained consciousness and tried to stand up. Jonaris then resumed his attack inflicting more than ten hammer blows to the back of her head, causing her death. He took away her watch and also slashed her wrists before he fled the scene. For this, the prosecution argued that Jonaris was able to carefully draft out a plan to murder Poh and used a fake name in order to meticulously carry out the crime.

Saifon Ngammoo, the Thai prostitute whom Jonaris first met in October 1997, testified that she told her boyfriend about a Rolex watch she used to own and gifted to her by her ex-husband, and the watch was later pawned in 1995 to help a friend. She reportedly told Jonaris that she missed the watch as she cherished it for its special value to her. She also told the court that on the day of her birthday (which fell on the same day of Poh's murder), Jonaris bought a bouquet of red roses, a cake, and a bottle of whiskey and brought them to her workplace, a brothel at Lorong 18 in Geylang. He also gave her a Rolex watch at the birthday party where a few other girls were present, and she noticed that it was not new. She said she asked Jonaris but he was angry in response, to which she told him she was joking and thanked him, without knowing that he stole the watch from Poh before killing her at Marina South.

=== Jonaris's defence ===
Jonaris's main defence was diminished responsibility. He said he suffered from depression, cannabis intoxication, and had an obsession with the Rolex watch.

Jonaris, who turned 24 in November 1998 during his trial, said that he was depressed before he killed Poh. His financial troubles did not go away despite his royal status, and he owed money to his mother and friends. He sought solace and fell in love with Saifon given that they both had troubled pasts, and he felt she understood him. Jonaris said that after hearing Saifon's story about the watch, he grew obsessed with the Rolex watch and it appeared in his dreams at times. He felt like possessing the watch after seeing Sally Poh wearing one, and Jonaris said he only paid attention to it despite seeing Poh's other valuables. On the day he met up with Poh at Marina South, Jonaris claimed that a voice in his mind told him to rob her of the watch. He said he was unable to control himself when his hand unknowingly took the hammer to bash at Poh's head, and could only see her mouth moving but no sound came out. As he walked away from the scene after taking her watch, he said he felt a kind of "happiness and relief" that he had never before experienced:

The colour of the water, the sky, the bird, was so new. I felt so free, like a renaissance, like a new beginning. Everything seemed so clean. It looked like a beautiful day.

Jonaris said that after robbing Poh of her Rolex watch, he went home to take a nap, and when he woke up, he thought he had had a nightmare of killing a person. Then it only dawned on him that everything was real when he found Poh's Rolex watch in his drawer.

Jonaris also revealed his painful childhood while on the stand. He said that when he was young, his Singaporean mother Elizabeth Seet divorced his father, Tengku Abdul Hamid Thani (who was the brother of the Sultan of Kedah), before she was married to Robert Seah. He recounted that he and his younger brother were abused by his stepfather and mother, who often physically abused them and considered them "outsiders" while treating their own two children well and with love. The couple used to force Jonaris to kneel for hours and clipped clothes pegs on his ears, fingers, lip and tongue. He would be made to chew raw chilli and stand in front of a mirror for hours, and often got caned and hit by a belt. He also claimed that his mother told him to say he was her nephew and not her son in public. The child abuse suffered by Jonaris was confirmed by his mother who took the stand and gave her testimony, and Seet said that her second husband Seah disliked her sons from the previous marriage and asked her to consider them as her nephews rather than her children. When asked by the trial judge if she considered her son fit enough to be punished, Seet replied yes.

Dr Chan Khim Yew, who was the prosecution's psychiatrist, assessed Jonaris and found that he was not suffering from depression or any abnormality of the mind. He said that Jonaris was able to clearly describe how he murdered Poh, and his emotions before and during the time he murdered Poh, as well as able to feel fear that Poh might report him to the police. Besides, Jonaris was still able to enjoy the company of his girlfriend and acquaintances, and mixed well with people around him, as well as enjoying sex with Saifon and working hard at his jobs until the day of the murder; this behaviour, according to Dr Chan, did not fit the description of someone suffering from depression. His supposed compulsion and obsession with the watch were not signs of a mental illness and it did not mean that a person who was abused as a child would suffer from any mental disorders. Many of his colleagues and friends noted that Jonaris was his usual self at the time he executed the murder plot.

On 2 December 1998, judgement was reserved and the verdict was scheduled to be given on 8 December 1998.

=== Death sentence ===
Jonaris Badlishah, who was sentenced to execution for Poh's murder.

On 8 December 1998, after a 19-day trial, Judicial Commissioner Amarjeet Singh released his final verdict, ruling that Jonaris was not suffering from diminished responsibility when he murdered Poh. He judged that Jonaris was normal, and was able to work hard, mingle with his friends, and fall in love with Saifon Ngammoo, which was not a symptom of any depressed mood or mental illnesses nearing or on the day of the murder. He noted that Jonaris's financial debts incurred at the time he met his girlfriend, and his job as a prop assistant only allowed him to earn a monthly salary of $2,000 but he often splurged $4,000 every month on his weekly four visits to his girlfriend at the brothel.

JC Singh also stated that Jonaris often boasted about his royal bloodline, wealth, and lifestyle while he lived in the house of his mother and step-father, and out of desperation to back up his lies, Jonaris committed the robbery for money. He added that when Sally Poh regained consciousness and tried to crawl away, Jonaris continually attacked her in cold blood by hitting her on the head until her skull broke into pieces. He even slashed her wrists with a paper cutter to allow her to bleed to death to not allow her to escape alive to report him. It would only mean that Jonaris was fully in control of himself at the time, and was able to act with quick thinking. Hence, it was judged that he was to face full responsibility and punishment for his cruel and inhumane conduct for depriving Poh of her possessions and right to live, in order to satisfy his greed.

For the murder of Sally Poh, 24-year-old Jonaris Badlishah was sentenced to death. According to reports, while Jonaris was led away from the court, Poh's widowed husband Lee Boon Siang, who was present at the courtroom to hear the verdict, was satisfied with the death sentence verdict and angrily shouted at Jonaris, "You deserve it!"

On 24 February 1999, Jonaris lost an appeal against his death sentence, and he was eventually hanged.

== Aftermath ==
The Rolex watch murder was considered a notable crime that shook Singapore. In July 2015, Singapore's national daily newspaper The Straits Times published an e-book titled Guilty As Charged: 25 Crimes That Have Shaken Singapore Since 1965, which included the 1998 Rolex murder as one of the top 25 crimes that shocked the nation since its independence in 1965. The book was borne out of a collaboration between the Singapore Police Force and the newspaper itself. The e-book was edited by ST News Associate editor Abdul Hafiz bin Abdul Samad. The paperback edition of the book was published and first hit bookshelves in June 2017. The paperback edition first entered the ST bestseller list on 8 August 2017, a month after publication.

The case was one of forensic pathologist Chao Tzee Cheng's famous cases; this was also his last reported major case, as Professor Chao died in New York in 2000, two years after the Rolex watch murder and one year after Jonaris was executed. The case was re-enacted in the 2014 crime show Whispers of the Dead, and it aired as the seventh episode of the show's second season. Details like Jonaris's name (it was changed to Ismail Radin) were changed for dramatic purposes, but overall, the way Jonaris murdered Poh and his defence in the trial was faithful to the real-life details.

== See also ==
- Capital punishment in Singapore
- List of major crimes in Singapore
