= Girls' Sports Club =

The Girls' Sports Club (GSC) was a women's sports club in Singapore. It was founded in 1929 by 12 young Eurasian women as the Goldburn Sports Club and renamed a year later. Among its founders was Zena Tessensohn (1909-1991), who was its secretary from 1932 to 1942, president for 44 years after World War II until early in 1991, and patron thereafter. At its 50th anniversary celebrations the club named Alice Pennefather (1903-1983) as "The Outstanding Playing Member of the GSC". The club closed in 1996.

The club played hockey, netball, tennis and latterly softball and football.
