= Van Kleef Aquarium =

Defunct aquarium in River Valley Road, Singapore

- Interactive map of Van Kleef Aquarium
- 1°17′34.4″N 103°50′42.7″E
- Date opened: 8 September 1955; 70 years ago
- Date closed: 31 May 1991; 35 years ago
- Location: River Valley Road, Singapore
- No. of animals: 6,500
- No. of species: 180
- Annual visitors: 400,000 (1970s); 248,000 (1985)

Van Kleef Aquarium was an oceanarium located along River Valley Road, at the foot of Fort Canning Hill, in Singapore. Fully air-conditioned, the aquarium had 6,500 animals at the time of opening, which were housed in freshwater, seawater, and swamp tanks.

The decision to develop the aquarium was made in 1935 by the Municipal Commission of Singapore, as a way to use the money bequested to the Municipal Commission by Karel William Benjamin Van Kleef in 1930 for the "embellishment of the city". While the site and name of the aquarium were chosen by 1936, and plans for it drawn up in 1937, the aquarium was only approved in 1939 due to cost concerns. Construction subsequently began in 1940, but work was halted after piling was completed due to rising material costs, only resuming in 1952 on a new site. The aquarium opened in September 1955, after multiple delays and with part of the costs borne by the City Council of Singapore, and had 150,000 visitors in its first three months of operation. The aquarium remained popular through the 1970s, but by 1991, despite having been renovated between 1986 and 1987 for $750,000, it was viewed as out of date and it closed in May 1991.

The aquarium was subsequently reopened as World of Aquarium in October 1991, which closed less than two years later due to poor business, and again as Fort Canning Aquarium in 1993, but it eventually closed for good in 1996 and was demolished two years later.

== History ==
=== Background ===
A public aquarium in Singapore was first proposed in 1922 by the Natural History Society of Singapore, and was considered by the local government around the time of Singapore's centenary. The Singapore Free Press and Mercantile Advertiser claimed that these proposals were seen as meaningful and attractive, given the suitability of the fish in Singapore and Malaya to living in aquariums.

When Karel Willem Benjamin Van Kleef, who had been a broker in Singapore, died in 1930, he left his fortune to the Singapore Municipality for the "embellishment of the city". The Municipal Commission convened a committee to make recommendations regarding the use of the money, and the committee sought suggestions from the general public. Among the suggestions made was one regarding building a public aquarium. In 1933, the committee recommended spending the money on either of two projects, the conversion of the old race course into playing fields and the construction of an aquarium.

=== Construction and opening ===
In March 1935, the Municipal Commission decided on using the money bequested by Van Kleef to build an aquarium opposite the Raffles Museum, but this proposal was dropped in April 1935 owing to strong opposition. The government then offered an alternative site on the western slope of Fort Canning Hill between Tank Road and River Valley Road for the aquarium, which was accepted by the Municipal Commission in November 1935.

The aquarium was named the Van Kleef Aquarium in September 1936, and plan for the aquarium were drawn up by 1937. Concerns over the cost of construction and maintenance of the aquarium delayed its approval, and the aquarium was only approved by the Municipal Commission in May 1939. Construction of the aquarium began in 1940, but work was stopped after the completion of piling works due to the outbreak of World War II in Europe driving prices of construction materials up.

In September 1949, an appeal was made by Roland Braddell, president of the Friends of Singapore, to build a cultural centre using the funds bequested by Van Kleef, instead of the aquarium, but the Municipal Commission decided to continue development of the aquarium in November that year. Construction of the Van Kleef Aquarium commenced in 1952, with half of the costs borne by the City Council and on a new site. Collection of fish to stock the aquarium and of coral to decorate the aquarium tanks had started by January 1954. In addition, the City Council attempted to find a descendant of K.W.B. Van Kleef to open the aquarium, but the search was deemed too difficult and was called off, and Frederick Akhurst, an assistant curator at the London Zoo, assisted in the organisation of the aquarium and advised on its maintenance.

In October 1954, most of the fish in the aquarium tanks died due to high alkalinity of the water in the tanks, so the aquarium tanks were cleaned and changed to not incorporate any coral, which was found to contribute to the alkaline nature of the water. Initially expected to open in September 1954, the aquarium's expected opening date was pushed back to April 1955 due to the death of the fish. A report by The Straits Times on the aquarium's lack of fish and a strike by City Council workers resulted in further postponement, and the aquarium eventually opened on 8 September 1955.

=== Initial operations ===
After its opening, the aquarium performed above the City Council's expectations, receiving 150,000 visitors and raking in $40,000 in revenue in it first three months of operation. In 1961, the aquarium underwent $30,000 worth of improvement works, which consisted of the addition of a new tank and a backup power generator, and the refurbishment of existing systems and tanks. The aquarium started selling sea water to marine fish enthusiasts in 1967, and remained largely popular with locals and foreigners in the 1970s.

In March 1981, the Sentosa Development Corporation made a request to the Ministry of National Development (MND) for the aquarium to be moved to Sentosa to be part of a proposed oceanarium, but the request was declined. From 1986 to 1987, the aquarium was renovated at a cost of S$750,000 over a period of 18 months, comprising structural works and the refurbishment of display tanks. Nevertheless, the aquarium was seen as not up to date to modern standards, especially in comparison to the then-new Underwater World, so MND closed the aquarium at the end of May 1991, intending to lease the aquarium building to private businesses to sell and showcase ornamental fish.

=== Further reopenings, closures and demolition ===
The aquarium was subsequently handed over to a private company and reopened as World of Aquarium in October 1991. With aquatic murals painted at its entrance, the aquarium also sold aquarium fish and handled the import, export and breeding of tropical fish. World of Aquarium closed in February 1993 due to poor business, and the aquarium was subsequently transferred to another tenant in March 1993, reopening as the Fort Canning Aquarium later that year.

The aquarium closed its doors for the last time in 1996, and the building was demolished in 1998.

== Exhibits ==
At the time of the aquarium's opening, it was stocked with around 6,500 fish of about 180 species, housed in three tanks, freshwater, seawater, and swamp tanks. With 1 in (2.5 cm) thick glass walls, the water within the tanks was kept at a temperature of around 80 °F (27 °C; 300 K), and pumps kept the water in motion within the freshwater and saltwater tanks. The tanks were also connected to a water circulation system comprising two underground tanks, and the aquarium's roof was designed to collect rainwater, which was then filtered and diverted into these tanks.

Fully air-conditioned, the aquarium had two levels, with the air-conditioning systems and pumps were housed on the lower level, which was off-limits to the public. The upper level comprised several dimly lit rooms ringed by the aquarium tanks, as well as offices and an inquiry counter. The seawater tanks housed multiple types of fish, octopuses and other marine animals, with several tanks dedicated to sea anemones and turtles, while the freshwater tanks contained freshwater fish from Malaya and other parts of the world. Embellished with sand, rocks and corals, the tanks were connected to service passages to facilitate the maintenance and upkeep of them as well as their inhabitants.

After the aquarium's refurbishment in 1987, it housed more than 6,000 animals, which were grouped into different themes. Piped music consisting of the sounds of the sea and light pop music was also played in the aquarium.

== See also ==
- List of aquaria
- Underwater World, Singapore
