= 1988 in Singapore =

- Decades: 1960s; 1970s; 1980s; 1990s; 2000s
- See also: Other events of 1988; Timeline of Singaporean history

The following lists events that happened during 1988 in Singapore.

== Incumbents ==
- President: Wee Kim Wee
- Prime Minister: Lee Kuan Yew

== Events ==
=== January ===
- 15 January – Catherine Lim's novel, Or Else, the Lightning God and Other Stories, is selected for the O Level exams conducted internationally in the 1989 and 1990 edition. This marks the first time Singapore literature is selected for examinations.

=== February ===
- 27 February – Zoe Tay was crowned the winner in the finals of the inaugural season of the long-running Singaporean reality television programme Star Search on SBC 8.

=== March ===
- 12 March – The MRT system is officially opened, with the opening of a new section from Tiong Bahru to Clementi.

=== April ===
- April - The first Watsons store opens in Singapore.
- 22 April – The National Blood Centre is officially opened. The new facilities will have a spacious environment, and can handle 120,000 donors, double the previous premises. The centre can handle national emergencies with mass casualties. In addition, a blood research facility and public health lab will be housed.

=== June ===
- 1 June – Group representation constituencies (GRCs) are introduced.
- 9 June – The National Skin Centre starts operations.
- 27 June – The National Pledge is now taken with a right fist on the chest.

=== July ===
- 26 July – The New Paper was launched as a tabloid.

=== August ===
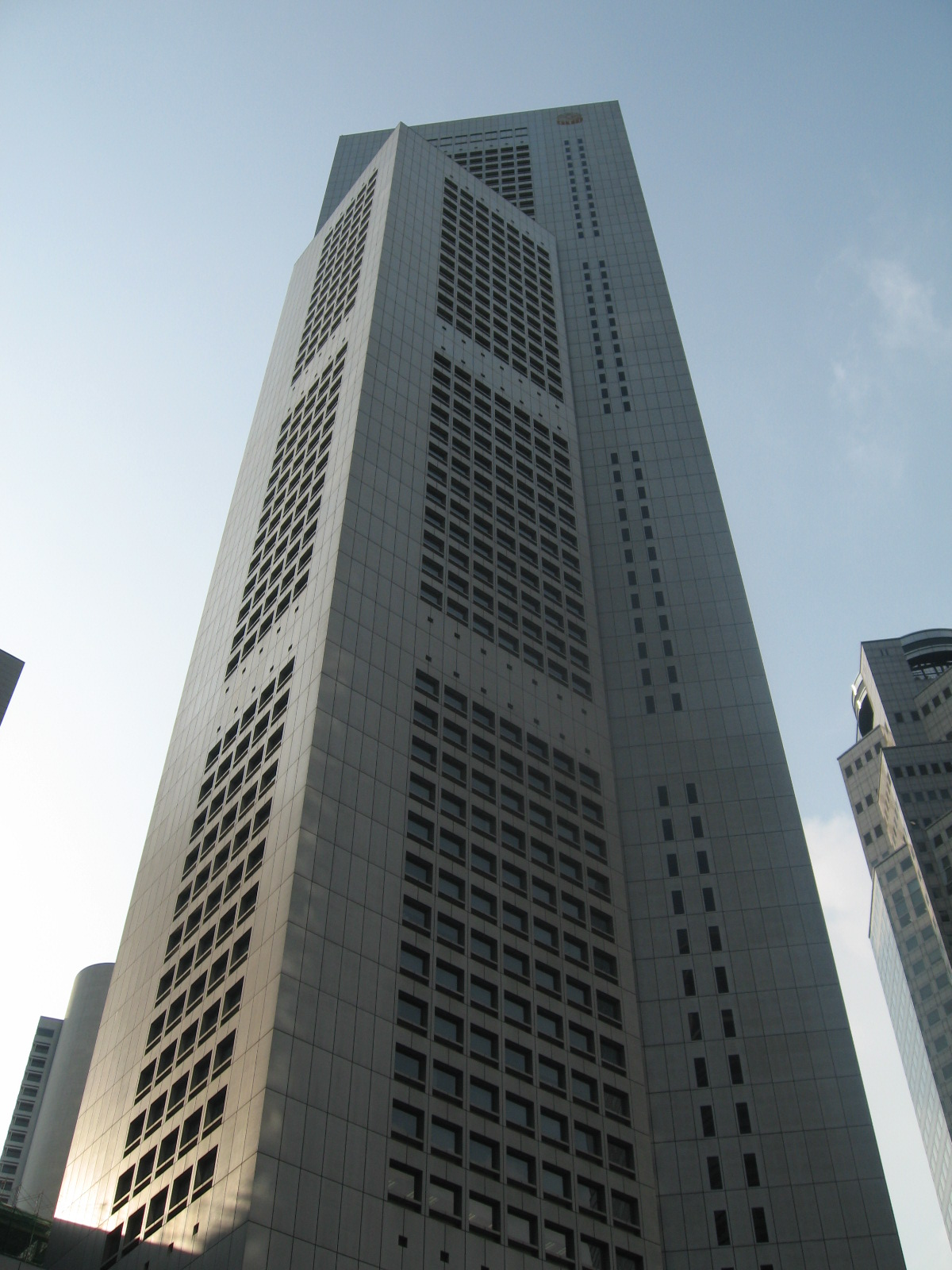
The OUB Centre

- 8 August – The OUB Centre (present-day One Raffles Place) is officially opened. At 280 metres, it stands as Singapore's tallest building until Guoco Tower's completion in 2016, which stands at 290 metres.
- 10 August – Kuo Pao Kun's Mama Looking for Her Cat is staged for the first time, making it Singapore's first multilingual play.
- 13 August – The first Malay Language and Cultural Month is officially opened.
- 30 August – The Operations Control Centre of the Singapore MRT system is officially opened.

=== September ===
- 3 September – The People's Action Party wins the 1988 General Election with 63.17% of the overall popular vote, winning 80 out of 81 seats in Parliament.

=== October ===
- 25 October – A major fire took place at the Singapore Refining Company (SRC) refinery in Pulau Merlimau.
- 29 October – NTUC Pasir Ris Resort is officially opened.

=== November ===
- 5 November – The fourth section of the MRT system is opened from Jurong East to Lakeside.

=== December ===
- 20 December – The fifth section of the MRT is opened from Yishun to Khatib.

=== Date unknown ===
- The 1988 Singapore Lunar Year of the Dragon 1oz Gold Coin was struck by the Singapore Mint in the year 1988 and belongs to the popular Lunar series of gold bullion coins. Each 24k coin contains 1 troy ounce (31.1035 grams) of gold and is legal tender with a face value of $100
- Portek, a medium-sized terminal operator and port equipment engineering provider is founded.

== Births ==
- 29 January – Tay Kexin, Singer.
- 14 June – Sylvia Ratonel, Singer.
- 6 July – Mok Ying Ren, Singaporean long-distance runner
- 5 August – Lawrence Wong Koon-Yat, tctor.
- 14 September – Charlie Goh, Actor.
- 3 October – Jeffrey Xu, Shanghai-based television Actor.
- 2 November – Dee Kosh, Radio DJ and YouTube personality.

== Deaths ==
- 15 January – Lim Choo Sye, former Liberal Socialist Party city councillor for Moulmein Constituency (b. 1909).
- 7 March – T. Kulasekaram, former judge of the High Court (b. 1919).
- 10 March – Lü Chen Chung, Bible Chinese translator (b. 1898).
- 3 April – Lee Man Fong, artist (b. 1913).
- 10 April – Tan Teck Chwee, 9th Chairman of the Public Service Commission (b. 1917).
- 6 May – Leow Kim Fatt, badminton player (b. 1911).
- 14 May – Zhuang Xiquan, Chinese community leader and founding member of the Nanyang Girls' High School (b. 1888).
- 25 November – Chi Owyang, former banker and Singaporean Ambassador to Thailand (b. 1897).
- 19 December – Lim Han, editor of Chinese newspaper Sin Chew Jit Poh and later Lianhe Zaobao (b. 1929).
- 22 December – Kouo Shang Wei, pioneer photographer (b. 1924).
- 24 December – Gan Sien Khian, former Progressive Party municipal commissioner for West Constituency (b. 1911).
