= 1982 in Singapore =

- Decades: 1960s; 1970s; 1980s; 1990s; 2000s
- See also: Other events of 1982; Timeline of Singaporean history

The following lists events that happened during 1982 in Singapore.

== Incumbents ==
- President: C.V. Devan Nair
- Prime Minister: Lee Kuan Yew

== Events ==
=== January ===
- 1 January – The time zone in Singapore has changed to UTC+08:00 and it has not changed since.
- 2 January – The metric system of weights and measures is introduced, replacing the Imperial units.

=== February ===
- 23 February – The Sentosa Monorail is opened, making travelling convenient for visitors.

=== March ===
- 20–24 March - The first Festival of Dance (which was the early form of the current Singapore Arts Festival) was held at Victoria Theatre.

=== May ===
- 14 May – Singa the Lion is unveiled as the National Courtesy Campaign's mascot, being launched two weeks later.
- 28 May – The Government allows the building of the Mass Rapid Transit after a 10-year debate. The first lines to be constructed are the North South MRT line and the East West MRT line, scheduled for 1984. To fund the MRT, money earned from land plots in Marina Bay will be used.

=== June ===
- 11 June – The Sentosa Musical Fountain is officially opened. It ran for 25 years until its closure in 2007.

=== July ===
- 1 July – New Nation newspaper is replaced by Singapore Monitor.
- 25 July – The first locally produced drama, Seletar Robbery, is shown on SBC 8.

=== October ===
- 1 October – The Postal Services Department merges into the Telecommunication Authority of Singapore, giving better services.

=== November ===
- 6 November – The National Civil Defence Plan was launched, setting guidelines for emergency preparations.

=== Date unknown ===
- Ang Peng Siong was ranked world's No.1 in 1982 for clocking 22.69s in the 50m freestyle during the US Nationals and was named the World's Fastest Swimmer for 1982 by Swimming World magazine.

== Births ==
- 24 January – Fiona Xie, actress.
- 2 June – Jonathan Leong, singer, runner-up of Singapore Idol (Season 2).
- 7 September – Race Wong, former singer and 2R member, entrepreneur and co-founder of Ohmyhome.

== Deaths ==
- 25 January – Lam Thian, leading member of the Singapore Chinese Chamber of Commerce and Industry, Chinese community leader and former Democratic Party candidate for Tanjong Pagar Constituency in the 1955 General Election (b. 1927).
- 9 February – R. A. Hamid, trade union activist (b. 1923).
- 17 February – Seah Peng Chuan, former Labour Front legislative assemblyman for Kampong Kapor Constituency (b. 1914).
- 27 February – Goh Soon Tioe, violinist (b. 1911).
- 1 March – Aw Kow, former managing director of Chinese newspaper Sin Chew Jit Poh and founder of English newspaper Eastern Sun (b. 1913).
- 22 June – Lancelot Maurice Pennefather, famous sportsman (b. 1894).
- 9 August – Yap Ee Chian, Hokkien community leader, businessman and philanthropist (b. 1907).
- 28 October – Wong Ming Yang, doctor and first wife of 3rd Prime Minister Lee Hsien Loong (b. 1951).
- 29 October – Lim Yong Liang, Singaporean footballer (b. 1900).
- 8 December
  - H. J. C. Kulasingha, former Progressive Party legislative councillor for Bukit Timah Constituency (b. 1900).
  - Low Kway Song, artist (b. 1889).
