= 1989 in Singapore =

- Decades: 1960s; 1970s; 1980s; 1990s; 2000s
- See also: Other events of 1989; Timeline of Singaporean history

The following lists events that happened during 1989 in Singapore.

== Incumbents ==
- President: Wee Kim Wee
- Prime Minister: Lee Kuan Yew

== Events ==
=== January ===
- 1 January – The first 24-hour radio station in Singapore, Perfect Ten 98.7FM, starts broadcast.
- 13 January – The Public Works Department announced the building of two bridges to Sentosa and Pulau Brani, which will be completed by 1992.
- 15 January – TransitLink starts operations, which is formed by SMRT, Singapore Bus Services and Trans-Island Bus Services to develop an integrated bus-rail public transport system.

=== February ===
- 21 February – Tradewinds starts its first flight, which is formed in 1975 as a hotelier.

=== April ===
- 14 April – The National Skin Centre is officially opened to treat skin diseases and research skin conditions.
- 30 April – Change Alley closes its doors. It reopens as an air-conditioned passageway in 1993.

=== June ===
- 10 June – The New Psychiatric Hospital (now known as the Institute of Mental Health) starts construction, which has state of the art facilities when completed.

=== August ===
- 26 August – The first community hospital starts construction in Ang Mo Kio. The hospital will have community involvement with the participation of family doctors.

=== September ===
- 1 September – The Urban Redevelopment Authority is revamped, taking over land use planning from the Ministry of National Development. This results in the transfer of properties to Pidemco Land (present day CapitaLand).

=== November ===
- 1 November – The National Youth Council is formed as a division of the People's Association to work on youth matters.
- 4 November – The sixth section of the MRT system is opened from Marina Bay to Tanah Merah.
- 6 November – Singapore is one of the founding members of the Asia-Pacific Economic Cooperation (APEC).

=== December ===
- 6–10 December – 1989 World Badminton Grand Prix is held.
- 16 December – The seventh section of the MRT system is opened from Simei to Pasir Ris.
- 28 December – SingTel launches its ISDN network, making Singapore the first in the world to have ISDN nationwide.
- 31 December – Singapore Indoor Stadium was officially opened in an inaugural ceremony by the Prime Minister of Singapore, Lee Kuan Yew.

== Births ==
- 19 February – Xu Bin, actor.
- 1 March – Joshua Ang, actor.
- 23 May – Tosh Zhang, actor.
- 18 June – Gen Neo, K-Pop singer.
- 18 August – Yu Mengyu, national table tennis player.
- 26 October – Shayna Ng, national bowler.
- 13 December – Ian Fang, actor.

== Deaths ==
- 12 January – Lee Lim, artistic photographer (b. 1931).
- 15 January – Madai Puthan Damodaran Nair, former legislative assemblyman for Seletar Constituency (b. 1920).
- 2 March – Ernest Steven Monteiro, physician and former Ambassador of Singapore to Cambodia, United States and Brazil (b. 1904).
- 23 March – Lee Dai Sor, Cantonese storyteller (b. 1913).
- 1 May – Chan Kum Chee, former Progressive Party city councillor for East Constituency (b. 1915).
- 30 May – Ellice Handy, food writer and former Principal of Methodist Girls' School (b. 1902).
- 5 June – Huang Pao Fang, Chinese ink painter and educator (b. 1912).
- 17 July – Liow Yew Chye, former Commander of the Volunteer Special Constabulary (b. 1934).
- 21 July – Kow Kee Seng, former Barisan Sosialis legislative assemblyman for Paya Lebar Constituency (b. 1936).
- 9 October – Ngo Pit Cheong, community leader and businessman (b. 1912).
- 11 October – Haji Ya'acob bin Mohamed, former Senior Minister of State for the Prime Minister's Office and former PAP Member of Parliament for Bukit Timah Constituency, Southern Islands Constituency and Kampong Ubi Constituency (b. 1925).
- 20 October – T. J. D. Campbell, former Director, General Staff of the Singapore Armed Forces (b. 1922).
- 6 December – Ng Lee Kar, prominent community leader in Jurong and founder of Joo Long Public School (b. 1904).
