= 1985 in Singapore =

- Decades: 1960s; 1970s; 1980s; 1990s; 2000s
- See also: Other events of 1985; Timeline of Singaporean history

The following lists events that happened during 1985 in Singapore.

== Incumbents ==
- President: C.V. Devan Nair (until 28 March), Wee Chong Jin (Acting) (28 to 29 March), Yeoh Ghim Seng (Acting) (29 March to 2 September), Wee Kim Wee (starting 2 September)
- Prime Minister: Lee Kuan Yew

== Events ==
=== January ===
- January - Funan Centre opens to the public. It evolved to Funan The IT Mall, and finally Funan DigitaLife Mall, closing its doors on 30 June 2016.

=== February ===
- 1 February – The Small Claims Tribunal is established as part of the Subordinate Courts (present day State Courts of Singapore), which mainly deals with small claims.

=== March ===
- 28 March – Singapore's third President Devan Nair resigns. Chief Justice Wee Chong Jin and later Speaker of Parliament Yeoh Ghim Seng temporarily serve as acting president during that time.

=== April ===
- 2 April – The NTUC Pasir Ris Resort starts construction. When completed, the resort will have a wide array of recreational activities, supporting up to 1,400 people at any time. The resort is officially opened in 1988.
- 15 April – The Feedback Unit is formed to allow people to feedback their concerns to the Government. It has since been replaced by REACH in 2006.

=== May ===
- 16 May – The first case of HIV is diagnosed at the Communicable Diseases Centre (present day National Centre for Infectious Diseases). The patient is subsequently warded at the CDC.
- 23 May - An 18 year old student, Winnifred Teo Suan Lie became a victim of rape and murder. Her naked body was discovered in bushes by police along Old Holland Road. It remains an unsolved case.

=== June ===
- 24 June – The National University Hospital is opened to the public, the first government-owned hospital to be privately run.

=== August ===
- 30 August – Wee Kim Wee becomes the fourth President of Singapore. He takes office on 2 September.

=== December ===
- 2 December – The Second Series Coins are launched, with the 5-cent, 10-cent, 20-cent and 50-cent coins the first to be issued.

=== Date unknown ===
- Singapore slips into its first recession during that time, as well as the Pan Electric crisis. (Early 1985)
- Shop N Save starts operations as a supermarket.
- Sheng Siong starts operations as a supermarket, taking over from the Savewell supermarket chain, which closed down the following year due to financial problems.

== Births ==
- 8 January – Jackson Lam, PAP Member of Parliament for Nee Soon GRC.
- 22 January – Yan Xu, table tennis player.
- 17 February – Hazlina Abdul Halim, PAP Member of Parliament for East Coast GRC.
- 17 March – Fadli Fawzi, Workers' Party Member of Parliament for Aljunied GRC.
- 9 April – Romeo Tan, actor.
- 16 June – Andie Chen, actor.
- 11 July – Foo Cexiang, PAP Member of Parliament for Tanjong Pagar GRC.

== Deaths ==
- 15 February – Chen Chong Swee, artist (b. 1910).
- 2 March – Runme Shaw, founder of Shaw Organisation and philanthropist (b. 1901).
- 14 March – Chan Tin Weng (Epsom Jeep), racing consultant and chief racing writer for The Straits Times (b. 1920).
- 4 May – George Benjamin Armstrong, former Labour Front city councillor for Stamford Constituency and the oldest election candidate in the 1984 General Election (b. 1911).
- 12 May – Song Kok Hoo, the first Asian to be the Deputy Commissioner of Police (b. 1906).
- 21 June – Ng Aik Huan, prominent businessman, Chinese community leader and member of the Nanyang University Council (b. 1908).
- 25 August – Yeo Thian In, industrialist and founder of Yeo Hiap Seng (b. 1898).
- 26 August – S. T. Bani, veteran trade unionist and former PAP and Barisan Sosialis legislative assemblyman for Thomson Constituency and Crawford Constituency (b. 1934).
- 15 December – Chew Swee Kee, former Minister for Education (b. 1918).
- 19 December – Wee Tock Sian, Vice-Chairman of the Singapore Hokkien Huay Kuan and a director of the United Overseas Bank (b. 1891).
