= 1984 in Singapore =

- Decades: 1960s; 1970s; 1980s; 1990s; 2000s
- See also: Other events of 1984; Timeline of Singaporean history

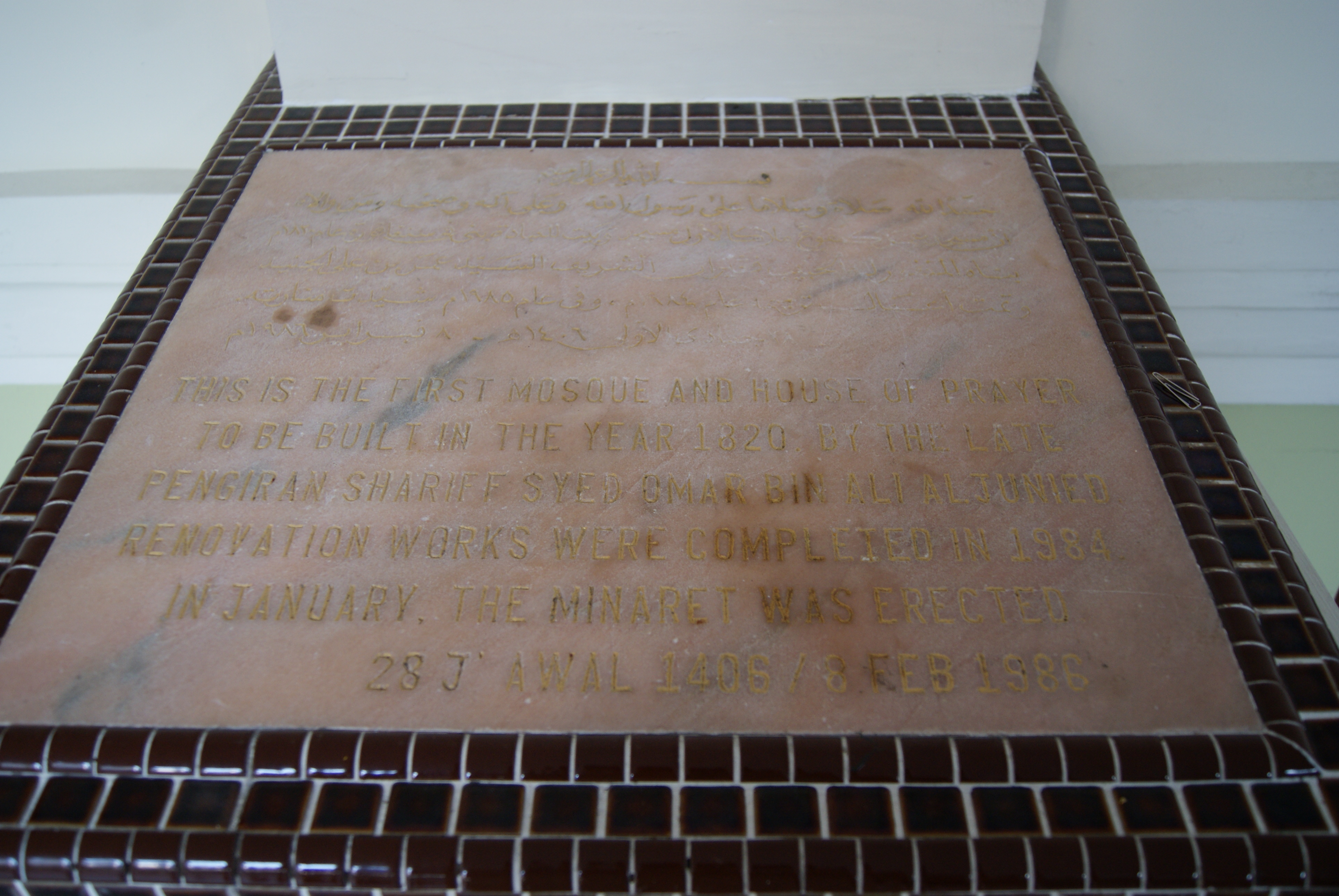

The following lists events that happened during 1984 in Singapore.

== Incumbents ==
- President: C. V. Devan Nair
- Prime Minister: Lee Kuan Yew

== Events ==
=== January ===
- 16 January – The National Theatre is closed after being declared structurally unsafe. The Theatre is eventually demolished.
- 17 January – The Singapore Science Park I is officially opened. The park will be managed by the Economic Development Board instead of Jurong Town Corporation.
- 20 January – Liang Court is officially opened.
- 22 January – Total Defence is launched to defend Singapore. Since then, Total Defence Day is commemorated on 15 February every year.

=== March ===
- 2 March – The Construction Industry Development Board is formed.
- 9 March – Parkway Parade mall is officially opened.
- 15 March – The Punggol Fishing Port and Wholesale Fish Market starts operations, which moved from Kangar market for the construction of Hougang New Town.

=== April ===
- 1 April – Medisave is launched as a personal savings scheme for medical bills.
- 17 April – Changi Airport's second runway is officially opened to cater for more flights.

=== July ===
- 2 July – The Physical Education College is opened, the first college in Singapore specialising in physical education. The institution is later renamed the College of Physical Education (CPE) and merged into the National Institute of Education in 1991.

=== August ===
- 4 August – Singapore Press Holdings is formed from a merger of four companies, namely Times Publishing Berhad, The Straits Times Press (1975) Limited, Singapore News and Publications Limited and Singapore Newspaper Services Pte Ltd, completed on 30 November.

=== September ===
- 1 September – The Civil Aviation Authority of Singapore is formed to manage Singapore's airspace more effectively, replacing the Department of Civil Aviation.

=== October ===
- 24 October – The Standard Chartered Bank Building (present day 6 Battery Road) is officially opened.
- 31 October – Creative Technology launches a made-in-Singapore computer called the Cubic 99.

=== November ===
- November - The Eat Frozen Pork is launched to reduce reliance on imports of fresh pork supplies. This comes as the Government moves to phase out pig farms. The campaign did not lead to substantial results.

=== December ===
- 1–16 December – Singapore hosts the Asian Cup 1984 for the first time, with the tournament ending with a 2–0 finish in favour of Saudi Arabia against the Chinese team.
- 22 December – The PAP wins the 1984 General Election while two members of the opposition parties are elected as members of parliament.

== Births ==
- 2 February – Zhang Zhenhuan, actor.
- 28 April – Xiaxue, blogger and celebrity.
- 19 September – Gerald Koh, radio DJ.
- 8 October – Kendrick Lee, national badminton player.
- 24 October – Felicia Chin, actress.
- 27 December – Dai Xiangyu, actor.

== Deaths ==
- 13 February – Cheong Eak Chong, businessman and philanthropist (b. 1888).
- 12 March – L. M. Harrod, librarian, director of Raffles Library (b. 1905).
- 15 March – Tang Peng Yeu, former Labour Front city councillor for Queenstown Constituency (b. 1918).
- 1 April – Tan Yeok Seong, historian and a collector of books and historical artefacts (b. 1903).
- 25 May – Vayloo Pakirisamy Pillai, member of the Singapore Advisory Council and the Municipal Commission of Singapore and Indian community leader (b. 1894).
- 28 June – Fok Tai Loy, engineer, part-time lecturer and 1st Chairman of Singapore Democratic Party (b. 1933).
- 23 October – Hu Tsai Kuen, oldest general practitioner and Hakka community leader (b. 1895).
- 28 October – Lai Weng Cheong, civil servant and trade unionist (b. 1940).
- 29 October – Lim Koon Teck, barrister, industrialist and former Progressive Party legislative assemblyman for Paya Lebar Constituency (b. 1904).
- 30 November – Lim Yew Hock, 2nd Chief Minister of Singapore (b. 1914).
