= Deputy commissioner =

Police, income tax or administrative official

Deputy commissioner (popularly abbreviated as "DC") is an administrative, income tax or police official in many countries. The rank is commonplace in police forces of Commonwealth countries, usually ranking below the Commissioner.

== Australia ==
In all Australian police forces, deputy commissioner is the rank directly below that of commissioner and senior to the rank of assistant commissioner. In all forces, excepting the New South Wales Police Force where the insignia is crossed and wreathed tipstaves surmounted by a crown, the same insignia as that of a lieutenant-general in the army, the insignia is a diamond (or a star, in the case of the Victoria Police), the same as that of a major-general in the army.

== Bangladesh ==
The Deputy Commissioner (popularly abbreviated to "DC") or District Magistrate is the executive head of the district, an administrative sub-unit of a division. The deputy commissioners are appointed by the government from a Deputy Secretary of BCS Administration Cadre. Deputy Commissioner of Taxes (popularly abbreviated as DCT) is an Income-tax authority. Deputy Commissioner of Taxes are basically officers of BCS Taxation Cadre. DCT includes Assistant Commissioner of Taxes, Extra Assistant Commissioner of Taxes as well.

== Hong Kong ==
Hong Kong Police Force have three DCPs, which are in charge of the Operational Department, Management Department and National Security Department.

== India ==
=== Executive ===
The deputy commissioner or district magistrate is the executive head of a district, an administrative sub-unit of a state. The district magistrates are entrusted with overall responsibility for law and order, implementation of government schemes and are also authorised to hear revenue cases pertaining to the district. A district magistrate is also authorised to collect Land Revenue and is therefore also referred as a collector (revenue) and also to control encroachment of government land in the district. In India officers of Indian Administrative Service (IAS) cadre are appointed this office.

The designation Deputy Commissioner is commonly used for officers serving as deputies to a Commissioner in various government agencies, such as the Deputy Commissioner of Income Tax, Excise, Transport, and Food Safety.

=== Police ===
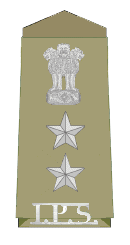
Deputy Commissioner of Police (Selection Grade) rank insignia.

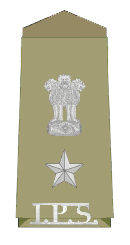
Deputy Commissioner of Police rank insignia.

The Deputy Commissioner of Police (DCP) is a senior police designation found exclusively in the police commissionerates of India, which are policing systems in major cities. The city's police force is headed by a Commissioner of Police, typically a high-ranking officer from the Indian Police Service. The DCP holds a position equivalent to the Superintendent of Police (SP) in the state police. In the hierarchy, the rank above DCP is Additional Commissioner of Police (Addl.CP), and below is Additional Deputy Commissioner of Police (Addl.DCP).

== New Zealand ==
In the New Zealand Police, deputy commissioner is the rank directly below that of the commissioner of police and senior to the rank of assistant commissioner. Deputy commissioner is the first rank that requires a statutory appointment. As of 2024 there are 3 deputy commissioners who command, Frontline Operations, Operational Services & Road Policing and People, Leadership & Culture. The rank insignia is a sword and a rectangular cylinder crossed over each other with a single star above.

== Pakistan ==
In Pakistan usually the Pakistan Administrative Service, formally known as District Management Group, cadre of the Central Superior Services or officers of Provincial Management Services erstwhile Provincial Civil Services are appointed to this office.

== Papua New Guinea ==
In the Royal Papua New Guinea Constabulary, there are three Deputy Commissioners. They report to the Police Commissioner and are in charge of all Police Duties by directing their respective ACP's.

- Operations
- Administration
- Training, Reform and APEC

== United Kingdom ==
The Deputy Commissioner of Police of the Metropolis is the deputy head of the Metropolitan Police Service.

The City of London Police now uses the term "deputy commissioner" for the rank directly beneath commissioner; this was traditionally "assistant commissioner". As of 2025, there are two deputy commissioners.

== See also ==
- Deputy Commissioner of Police (Singapore)
- Police commissioner
