= 1990 in Singapore =

- Decades: 1970s; 1980s; 1990s; 2000s; 2010s
- See also: Other events of 1990; Timeline of Singaporean history

The following lists events that happened during 1990 in Singapore.

== Incumbents ==
- President: Wee Kim Wee
- Prime Minister: Lee Kuan Yew (until 28 November), Goh Chok Tong (starting 28 November)

== Events ==
=== January ===
- 1 January – YES 933, a Mandarin radio station, starts broadcast.
- 22 January – DBS Land (present day CapitaLand) through its subsidiary Real Estate Holdings Pte Ltd is awarded the project to restore Clarke Quay, which will be completed by 1993 along with Boat Quay. These conserved shophouses will have shopping, entertainment and recreation facilities.

=== February ===
- 7 February – The Ministry of Health allows the transplant of heart and liver on a pilot basis, making it the first such transplant.
- 13 February – The Singapore Aviation Academy starts construction, formed from the previous Training Centre. The Academy's new building will have more aviation courses, state-of-the-art equipment, among other stuff. The facility, when completed by end 1991, will be the first in Asia. It officially opened in 1992.

=== March ===
- 10 March – The Branch MRT line is opened from Jurong East to Choa Chu Kang. It merged into the North South MRT line in 1996 following the Woodlands Extension.
- 24 March – The first phase of the Seletar Expressway opened.

=== April ===
- 1 April – Class 95FM starts broadcast.
- 2 April – The first bidding for Certificates of Entitlement took place.
- 6 April – Temasek Polytechnic was established as Singapore's third polytechnic.

=== May ===
- 4 May – The combined Fraser and Neave and Asia Pacific Breweries factory opens in Tuas.
- 15 May – Known as the Amber Beacon Tower murder, a young couple were attacked by two unknown men at the tower in East Coast Park during their date. The girlfriend, Kelly Tan Ah Hong, was killed while her boyfriend James Soh Fook Leong was grievously injured. The murder remains unsolved till today.

=== July ===
- 1 July – Medishield is launched as an insurance scheme, providing an additional buffer for medical costs. It has since been replaced by Medishield Life in 2015 for universal coverage.
- 6 July -
  - The MRT system is completed with the opening of Boon Lay.
  - Singapore's first heart transplant is performed on Wee Soo Hup, a 59-year-old retired information officer suffering from terminal heart disease, led by Dr Tong Ming Chuan from the Singapore General Hospital. The operation is declared a success.
- 29 July – 31 July – APEC Singapore 1990

=== September ===
- 29 September – Singapore's first liver transplant is performed on 25-year-old Surinder Kaur, led by Dr Susan Lim from the National University Hospital. The operation is declared successful.

=== October ===
- October - The Singapore National Eye Centre starts operations.
- 13 October – The first 8 Days issue is published.
- 31 October – SingTel launched Teleview, a service which provides information instantly. The launch of Teleview makes it the first picture-quality videotext system in the world.

=== November ===
- 3 November – Construction starts on bridges linking mainland Singapore to Sentosa and Pulau Brani, which will be completed by 1992.
- 22 November -
  - Changi Airport Terminal 2 begins operation.
  - The first Nominated Members of Parliament, Leong Chee Whye and Maurice Choo, were appointed.
- 25 November – The Farecard and integrated Ticketing System is launched by TransitLink.
- 27 November – The Malaysia–Singapore Points of Agreement of 1990 is signed over the issue of Keretapi Tanah Melayu land in Singapore, as well as joint development of land with a ratio of 60:40. However, the way the agreement was implemented resulted in disputes, with it completely resolved on 24 May 2010.
- 28 November -
  - Goh Chok Tong becomes the second Prime Minister of Singapore.
  - The Ministry of Information and the Arts is formed from the previous Ministry of Communications and Information and sections of the previous Ministry of Community Development. This will help to create a culturally vibrant Singapore.

=== December ===
- 1 December – Ria 89.7FM launched as the second Malay radio station.
- 26 December – Inuka is born in Singapore Zoo, thus becoming the first polar bear to be born in the tropics.

== Births ==
- 11 February – Shawn Lee, actor.
- 13 February – Jonathan Chua, The Sam Willows member.
- 15 August – Benjamin Kheng, The Sam Willows member.
- 19 August - Joshua Tan, actor.
- 24 August – Aloysius Pang, Mediacorp actor (d. 2019).
- 30 August - Ruth Kueo, Singaporean-Taiwanese singer.
- 4 October – Shane Pow, Mediacorp actor.
- 18 October – Izat Ibrahim, singer.
- 22 December – Gabriel Quak, national football player.
- 25 December – Sandra Riley Tang, The Sam Willows member.
- 26 December – Inuka, first polar bear born in tropics (d. 2018).

== Deaths ==
- 27 January – Lee Bah Chee, former Liberal Socialist Party city councillor for Tiong Bahru Constituency (b. 1915).
- 19 February – Rahim Omar, football player (b. 1934).
- 25 April – See Hiang To, pioneering artist in Chinese painting, calligraphy and seal carving (b. 1906).
- 14 May – K. M. Byrne, diplomat, lawyer and former Cabinet Minister (b. 1913).
- 4 August – Chua Phung Kim, weightlifter (b. 1939).
- 7 September – Venerable Siong Khye, 4th President of the Singapore Buddhist Federation and co-founder of the Singapore Buddhist Free Clinic (b. 1916).
- 13 September – Toh Aik Choon, entrepreneur and trader (b. 1927).
- 18 September – Richard Eric Holttum, former director of the Singapore Botanic Gardens (b. 1895).
- 15 November – Yeo Siew Hua, former President of Ngee Ann Kongsi and Teochew Poit Ip Huay Kuan (b. 1915).
- 23 December – Quah Chin Lai, metal and machinery hardware tycoon and philanthropist (b. 1892).
- 25 December – Venerable Hong Choon, 2nd President of the Singapore Buddhist Federation and 2nd Chief Abbot of Kong Meng San Phor Kark See Monastery (b. 1907).
