= John Le Cain =

Singaporean police chief (1912–1993)

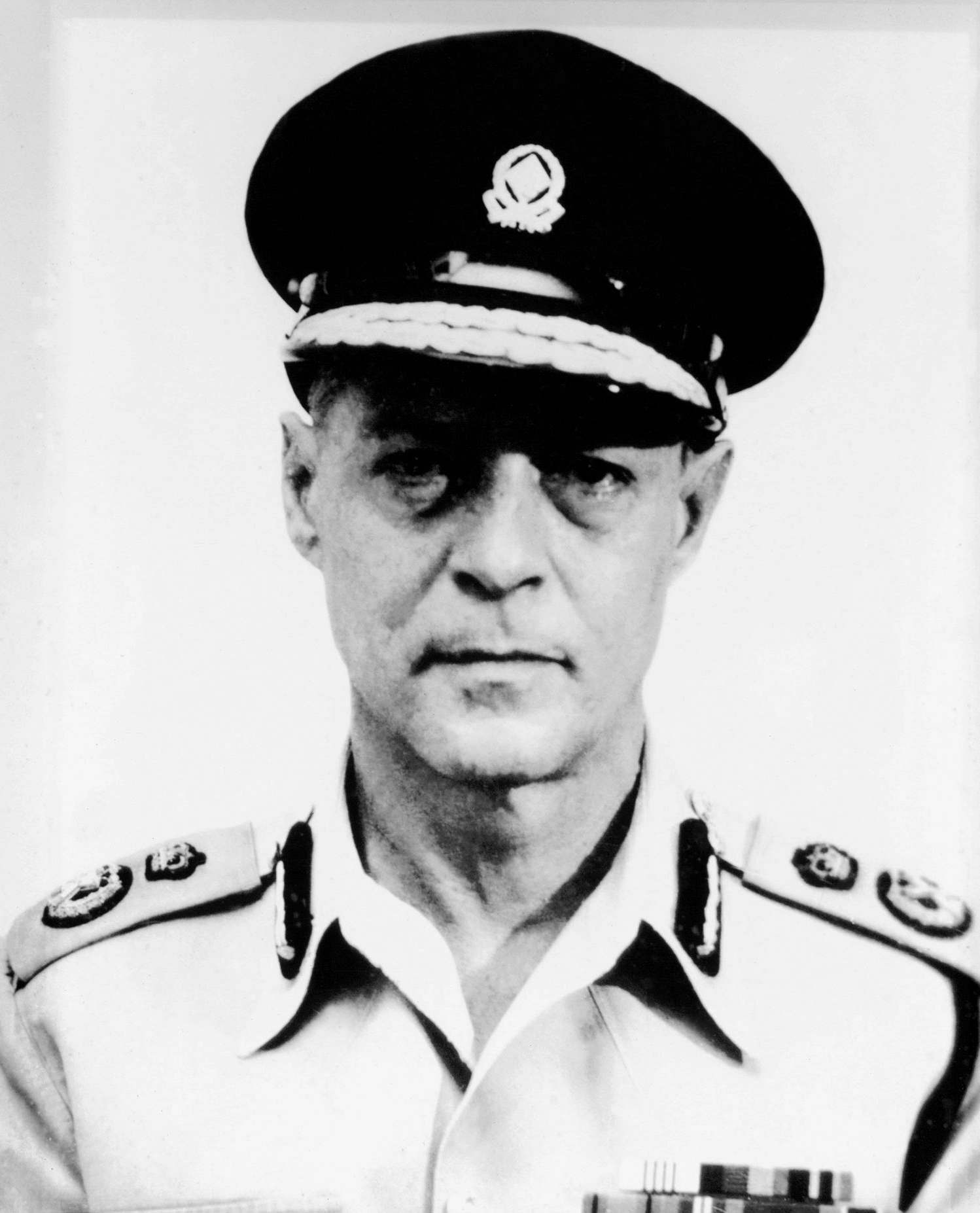
- Official portrait, 1963–1967

Commissioner of Police
- In office 2 July 1964 – 8 September 1967; Acting: 21 March 1963 – 2 July 1964
- Preceded by: Alan Edmund Grove Blades
- Succeeded by: Cheam Kim Seang

Personal details
- Born: 8 October 1912 Bangkok, Siam (now Thailand)
- Died: 11 January 1993 (aged 80) Singapore
- Education: Raffles Institution

John Le Cain (8 October 1912 – 11 January 1993) was a Singaporean former police officer that served as the Commissioner of Police in Singapore from 1964 to 1967. As a Eurasian, he was the first with Asian ancestry to be appointed to that post.

== Early life and education ==
Le Cain was born in Bangkok, Siam, on 8 October 1912. Two years later, he and his family moved to Singapore, then a part of the Straits Settlements, where he attended Saint Andrew's School and Raffles Institution.

== Career ==
From 1931 to 1939, Le Cain was employed as a law clerk at a law firm, after which he became a probationary inspector with the Straits Settlements Police Force. He was initially stationed at the Tanjong Pagar Police Station. In the following year, he joined the force's Special Branch, where he remained until the Fall of Singapore. During the subsequent Japanese occupation of Singapore, he was initially interned at the Changi Prison before being transferred to the Sime Road Camp. Following the end of WWII, he went on leave to India before joining the Malayan Security Service. In 1948, he was one of five officers to be promoted to the rank of Assistant Superintendent of Police in Singapore. In 1950, he spent six months training at the Ryton-on-Dunsmore Police Training Centre in Warwickshire, England. Upon his return, he was appointed the Commandant of the Police Training School in Singapore. He was also appointed the head of the Marine Police. In 1953, he was promoted to the rank of Deputy Superintendent of Police. In 1956, he was again appointed the head of the Police Training Centre, where he remained for a year.

Le Cain was promoted to the rank of Superintendent of Police in 1957. In the same year, he was awarded the Colonial Police Medal for Meritorious Service and appointed the head of the Corrupt Practices Investigation Bureau, a role which he held until 1959. From 1959 to 1960, he served as the Assistant Commissioner (Detachments). On 14 October 1961, he was appointed the acting Deputy Commissioner of Police in place of Song Kok Hoo, who was the first Asian to serve in that role. He was appointed the Deputy Commissioner on 8 June of the following year. On 19 June, he was appointed the acting Commissioner of Police in place of Alan Edmund Grove Blades, who had left for Britain on a six-week vacation. Le Cain was again appointed the acting Commissioner of Police on 21 March 1963 following Blades' retirement, with Appudhurai Thurai Rajah serving as the acting Deputy Commissioner. In the same year, he was conferred the Public Administration Medal (Gold).

On 2 July 1964, Le Cain was promoted to the rank of Commissioner of Police, becoming the first Asian to serve in that role, with Rajah succeeding him as the Deputy Commissioner. As the police commissioner, he oversaw the Singapore Police Force during the Indonesia–Malaysia confrontation, the 1964 race riots and the separation of Singapore from Malaysia in 1965. He was also conferred the Kesatria Mangku Negara in 1965. In the following year, he went for a training course at the Bramshill Police College in Hampshire, England. He retired in 1967, with his last day in office being on 15 July, after which he went on leave and was succeeded as the Commissioner of Police by Cheam Kim Seang. An hour-long farwell parade for Le Cain, which involved more than 1,100 police officers, was held at the Police Training Centre on 12 July. He officially retired on 8 September. In the same year, he was awarded the Meritorious Service Medal.

In September 1967, Le Cain was appointed the head of a committee established by Singapore Pools to "adjudicate on claims and complaints from Toto buyers." He was one of the committee's three members, along with Wilmot Rajasingam Rasanayagam, then the chairman of the Singapore Red Cross Society and David Yew Chong Kew, then the registrar of the Singapore Society of Accountants. From 1969 to 1971, he served as the Counsellor (Defence) to the Singapore High Commission in London.

On 21 November 2005, the John Le Cain Collection, which featured his medals and his scrapbook, was launched at the Police Heritage Centre as a tribute to Le Cain's service in the Singapore Police Force. The items were donated by his friend Lim Soo Peng and his grandnephew Leon Le Mercier.

== Personal life and death ==
Le Cain was an avid sportsman. In 1930, whilst attending Raffles Institution, he set a record for high jump at 5 ft 8½ in. He also played rugby, hockey and cricket.

La Cain married Minnie Kronenburg, a fellow Eurasian of German descent, on 24 March 1940. He had one son, Errol, in 1941, who died in 1989. Le Cain died on 11 January 1993, aged 80, following a short illness.
