= Patrick Joseph Shannon =

Irish law enforcement officer

Deputy Commissioner of Police
- In office 1947–1950
- Succeeded by: Edmund Victor Fowler

Commissioner of Constabulary
- In office 1947–1953

Personal details
- Born: 11 March 1902 Cork, Ireland
- Died: 26 August 1963 (aged 61) Hadley, London, England
- Spouse: Margaret Monica Looney (m. 1930)
- Awards: KPM

Military service
- Allegiance: United Kingdom
- Years of service: 1924–1953

Patrick Joseph Shannon KPM JP (11 March 1902 – 26 August 1963) was a law enforcement officer who served as Deputy Commissioner of Police (Singapore) from 1947 to 1950 and Commissioner of Constabulary (Sarawak) from 1947 to 1953.

== Career ==
In 1924, Shannon was commissioned to the Special Branch (Hong Kong). He was made a probationary inspector of the Straits Settlements in 1925 and an inspector in 1929. On 1 October 1928, he was made a peace officer. In 1938, he was made a Justice of the peace (JP). In 1940, Shannon was appointed the officer-in-charge of the Criminal Investigation Department (Singapore).

During World War II, he was held as a prisoner of war by the Japanese at Changi Prison. In 1947, Shannon was appointed the Deputy Commissioner of Police (Singapore). From 1949 to 1953, he served as the Commissioner of Constabulary (Sarawak). On 8 June 1950, he was appointed Assistant Commissioner of Police (Singapore).

Shannon was awarded the King's Police Medal for Gallantry (KPM) in the 1950 Birthday Honours.

== Personal life ==
Shannon was born on 11 March 1902 in Cork, Ireland, the son of Patrick J. Shannon and Margaret Roche. In 1930, he married Margaret Monica Looney, a civil servant, in Edmonton, London. After retiring in 1953, they moved to Hadley, London, where he died on 26 August 1963. At the time of his death, he resided in 57 Parkgate Crescent, Hadley Wood.

== See also ==
- Deputy Commissioner of Police (Singapore)
