= Singapore–Thailand relations =

Bilateral relations

- Singapore: Thailand

Diplomatic mission
- Singapore Embassy, Bangkok: Royal Thai Embassy, Singapore

Envoy
- Ambassador Kevin Cheok: Ambassador Manopchai Wongpakdee

Bilateral relations between the Republic of Singapore and the Kingdom of Thailand formally date to 1965, when Thailand established diplomatic relations soon after the independence of Singapore. Both countries are the founding members of the Association of Southeast Asian Nations.

== History ==
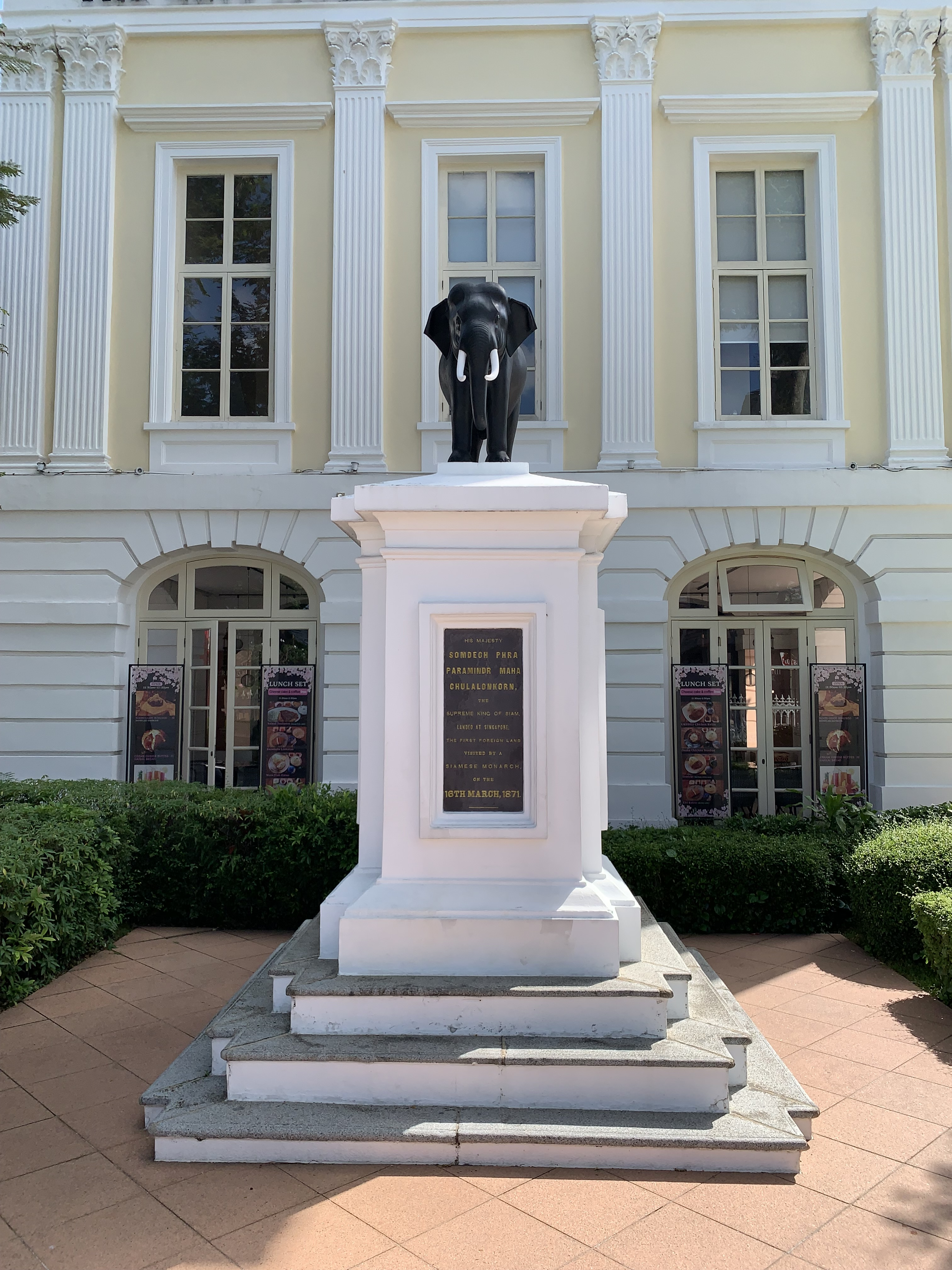
The elephant statue given by Rama V of Siam to Singapore

Singapore and Siam started trade relations before the founding of Singapore by Stamford Raffles. At that time, some Chinese Siamese merchants went to Singapore for trading activities. In 1871, King Rama V of Siam visited Singapore and this was the first time of the Monarchy of Thailand visiting a foreign country. During his visit, he gave an elephant statue to Singapore which stands outside the Old Parliament House today.

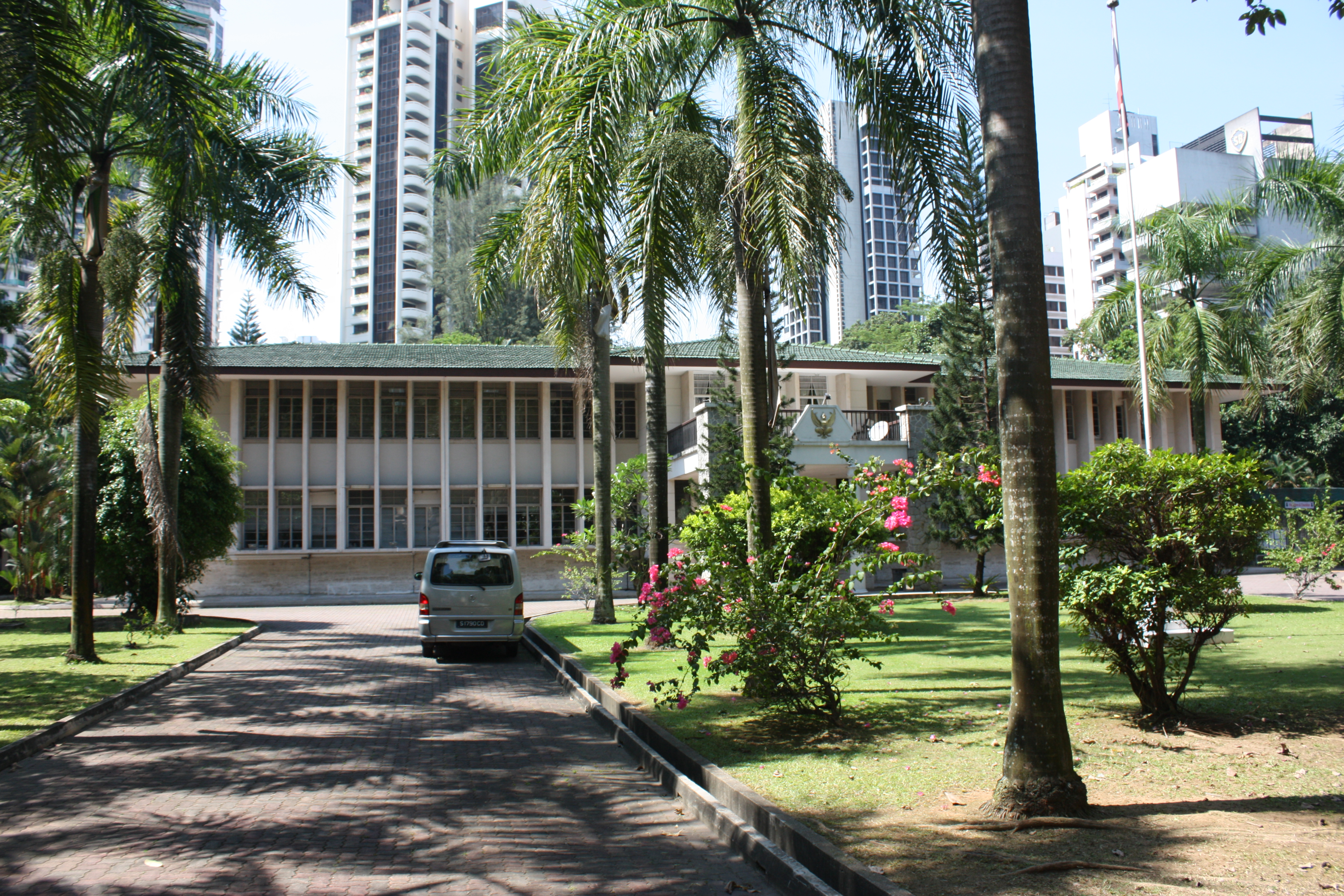
Thai embassy in Singapore

In 1965, Thailand established diplomatic relations with Singapore, which had just gained its independence from Malaysia. In 1967, both countries, with Malaysia, Indonesia and the Philippines, formed the Association of the Southeast Asian Nations. In 1978, when the Cambodian–Vietnamese War broke out, Singapore supported the actions of Thailand towards Cambodia. In 1997, the two countries established the relations of "Enhanced Partnership". In 2005, S.R. Nathan, the President of Singapore, visited Thailand, making the first visit of the President of Singapore to Thailand.

In August 2015, Tanasak Patimapragorn, the Deputy Prime Minister and the Minister of Foreign Affairs of Thailand, visited Singapore and met Lee Hsien Loong, the Prime Minister of Singapore. The leaders reaffirmed the longstanding and excellent relations between Singapore and Thailand. During Tanasak's visit, he also met K. Shanmugam, the Minister of Foreign Affairs of Singapore for the commemorative activities of the establishment of the diplomatic relations between the two countries, and the enhancement of the interpersonal relations between the two countries.

== Trade relations ==
According to the data from The Observatory of Economic Complexity, the exported values from Singapore to Thailand were between 2 billion and 4 billion US Dollars between 1995 and 2002. Then the value increased and rose to 7 billion US dollars in 2008. Though the value was dropped to 5 billion US dollars the next year, it then rose again and made a peak of 8 billion US dollars in 2013. Singapore mainly exported machines to Thailand. Since 2002, the scale of chemical products in exported products had increased.

Between 1995 and 2003, The exported values from Thailand to Singapore were between 4 billion and 6 billion US dollars. The values started rising in 2003 and the values increased to the range between 9 billion and 10 billion US dollars. Thailand mainly exported machines to Singapore while the proportion of refined petroleum in the exported products started to increase in 2003.

When Prayuth Chan-ocha, the Prime Minister of Thailand, visited Singapore in June 2015, Singapore and Thailand signed two agreements about the avoidance of double taxation and cruise travelling. Moreover, in order to provide a platform for trading, investments, commercial activities and personnel training, the Singapore Manufacturing Federation and the Federation of Thai Industries signed a memorandum of understanding.

== Cultural relations ==
Since 1997, Singapore and Thailand established Thailand-Singapore Civil Service Exchange Program for regular interactions of personnel and experiences. The program covers 13 aspects. Among these aspects, there are more educational interactions between the two countries. Both countries also have technical cooperation under the Singapore Cooperation Programme. Under the Thailand-Singapore Civil Service Exchange Program, both countries give technical assistance to countries like Cambodia, Laos, Vietnam, Myanmar and Timor-Leste.

In 2015, the Media Development Authority of Singapore and the Software Industry Promotion Agency of Thailand enhanced cooperation in broadcast, audiovisual, animation, game and digital media aspects by signing a memorandum of understanding. In the same year, the Silpakorn University of Thailand and the Singapore Wind Symphony staged a joint musical performance during an activity organized by the Ministry of Foreign Affairs of Thailand.

== Military relations ==
Both countries share close defence ties, regularly sending personnel for cross training and holding various annual exercises between Singapore Armed Forces and Royal Thai Armed Forces.

== See also ==
- Foreign relations of Singapore
- Foreign relations of Thailand
