= 1983 in Singapore =

- Decades: 1960s; 1970s; 1980s; 1990s; 2000s
- See also: Other events of 1983; Timeline of Singaporean history

The following lists events that happened during 1983 in Singapore.

== Incumbents ==
- President: C. V. Devan Nair
- Prime Minister: Lee Kuan Yew

== Events ==
=== January ===
- 1 January – The Trade Development Board is formed to promote trade, taking over the Timber Industry Board and the Department of Trade with responsibility for domestic trading of commodities handled by the Domestic Trade Section of the Ministry of Trade and Industry, and metrication taken over by the Singapore Institute of Standards and Industrial Research.
- 29 January – A disaster occurred on the Singapore Cable Car. As a result, 2 cable cars plunged, causing 7 fatalities.

=== February ===
- 5 February – The power generators at Jurong Power Station tripped, leading to a cascading effect of tripping both Senoko and Pasir Panjang Power Stations. Singapore was without power for eight hours and 42 minutes before all power was restored.

=== March ===
- 16 March – Two Chinese newspapers, the Nanyang Siang Pau and Sin Chew Jit Poh, merged to become Lianhe Zaobao and Lianhe Wanbao.

=== April ===
- 3 April – Trans-Island Bus Services starts operations as the second bus operator in Singapore, after the bus mergers of 1971 and 1974.Therefore, TIBS was renamed and reoperated as SMRT Buses on May 10, 2004.

=== May ===
- 28 May – 6 June - Singapore hosts the 12th Southeast Asian Games. It clinched fourth place with a total of 134 medals.

=== July ===
- 11 July – Fandi Ahmad signs for FC Groningen.
- 23 July - National Service conscript Sek Kim Wah and his accomplice Nyu Kok Meng went to rob a rich businessman and his family who lived in Andrew Road. Sek murdered three of the victims (which included the businessman, his wife and the family maid), with the remaining two hostages (the businessman's young daughter and the girl's tuition teacher) being released by Nyu, who protected them from Sek's murderous rampage, which would make headlines nationwide and brought shock to Singaporeans in 1983. Sek, who was also involved in an unrelated double murder that occurred a month earlier, was later arrested and sentenced to death for the five murders. Nyu, who turned himself in, was subsequently incarcerated for life and caned 6 strokes for armed robbery after the prosecution decided to dismiss the murder charges against him since he did not partake in the killings Sek committed. Sek was eventually hanged in Changi Prison Complex on 9 December 1988.

=== August ===
- 1 August – The Singapore Broadcasting Corporation launches SBCtext on SBC 5 and SBC 8.

=== September ===
- 9 September – The Community Chest of Singapore is launched by Ee Peng Liang. This is followed by the start of fund-raising efforts two days later.
- 16 September – Mitsukoshi Garden reopens as CN West Leisure Park.

=== October ===
- 22 October – The first phase of the MRT system starts construction.

=== December ===
- 3 December – David Bowie and his band visit Singapore as part of the 1983 Serious Moonlight Tour.
- 30 December – NOL's new building is officially opened.

=== Date unknown ===
- 100plus, a sports drink was launched to commemorate F&N's 100th anniversary.

== Births ==
- 19 January – Sylvester Sim, Singer, runner-up of Singapore Idol (Season 1).
- 31 January – Maia Lee, Singer, contestant of Singapore Idol (Season 1).
- 11 March – Kate Pang, Actress.
- 25 April – Joanne Peh, Actress.
- 16 June – He Ting Ru, Politician.
- 11 July - Kelly Poon, Singer.
- 18 August – Tay Kewei, Singer.
- 23 December – Tin Pei Ling, Politician.

== Deaths ==
- 13 January – Lau Boh Tan, construction magnate and Chinese community leader (b. 1904).
- 16 February – Wong Lin Ken, former Minister for Home Affairs (b. 1931).
- 24 February – Alice Pennefather, badminton and tennis player (b. 1903).
- 9 March – Lam Lu Cheung, educator and former Principal of the Chinese High School and Yeung Ching School (b. 1888).
- 23 March – Lim Han Hoe, physician and politician (b. 1894).
- 24 March – Tan Tsze Chor, businessman, renowned Chinese art collector, Chinese calligrapher and philanthropist (b. 1911).
- 29 March – Charles Lazaroo, music director of the Singapore Broadcasting Corporation (b. 1923).
- 22 April – Felice Leon-Soh, former Liberal Socialist Party city councillor for Mountbatten Constituency and founder of Singapore Congress (b. 1922).
- 6 June – Hajah Fatimah Chik binti Abdul Karim, former President of the Singapore Muslim Women's Association (b. 1918).
- 30 June – Choo Seng Quee, footballer (b. 1914).
- 1 July – Cheong Soo Pieng, artist (b. 1917).
- 15 August – Ho Changxiu, author and writer (b. 1890).
- 27 September – Oh Siow Yam, Chinese community leader, merchant and philanthropist (b. 1895).
- 14 October – Hon Sui Sen, former Minister for Finance (b. 1916).
