= 1980 in Singapore =

- Decades: 1960s; 1970s; 1980s; 1990s; 2000s
- See also: Other events of 1980; Timeline of Singaporean history

The following lists events that happened during 1980 in Singapore.

== Incumbents ==
- President: Benjamin Henry Sheares
- Prime Minister: Lee Kuan Yew

== Events ==
=== February ===
- 1 February – Radio Television Singapore is dissolved, transferring its assets to the Singapore Broadcasting Corporation.

=== May ===
- 1 May – The URA/HDB parking coupon are introduced.

=== August ===
- 6 August – The Singapore Democratic Party is formed.
- 8 August – The National University of Singapore is formed from a merger between then University of Singapore and Nanyang University.

=== December ===
- 17 December – A new ferry terminal will be built in Sentosa, which will be finished by September 1981.
- 23 December – The PAP wins all 75 seats in the 1980 General Election.

== Births ==
- 28 January – Hady Mirza, singer, winner of Singapore Idol (Season 2).
- 20 June – Alvin Tan, politician.
- 25 November – Ng Yi Sheng, writer.
- 17 December – Stella Huang, former singer.
- 23 December – Elvin Ng, actor.

== Deaths ==
- 22 May – Wong Foo Nam, architect and former Malayan Chinese Association legislative assemblyman for Pasir Panjang Constituency (b. 1912).
- 21 July – P. Govindasamy Pillai, businessman (b. 1887).
- 24 July – Philip Hoalim Senior, co-founder and former Chairman of the Malayan Democratic Union (b. 1895).
- 28 July – Claude Henry da Silva, former Member of the Legislative Council of the Straits Settlements and the Municipal Commission of Singapore and Eurasian community leader (b. 1891).
- 8 August – Chua Jim Neo, cookbook author and mother of Lee Kuan Yew (b. 1907).
- 22 September – Ng Wei York, one of the three Great Singaporean Chinese calligraphers (b. 1900).
- 11 October – Wong Siew Qui, lawyer and businessman (b. 1888).
- 14 October – Quek San Hoo, Chinese community leader (b. 1898).
