= 1981 in Singapore =

- Decades: 1960s; 1970s; 1980s; 1990s; 2000s
- See also: Other events of 1981; Timeline of Singaporean history

The following lists significant events that happened during 1981 in Singapore.

== Incumbents ==
- President:
  - Benjamin Henry Sheares (until 12 May), Yeoh Ghim Seng (Acting) (12 May to 23 October), C.V. Devan Nair (starting 23 October)
- Prime Minister: Lee Kuan Yew

== Events ==
=== January ===
- 25 January and 7 February - Adrian Lim, a self-professed medium, Catherine Tan Mui Choo and Hoe Kah Hong murders two children as "sacrifices" in a case known as the Toa Payoh ritual murders. This case becomes the second-longest murder trial in Singapore at that time, taking 41 days to complete. The three suspects are found guilty and sentenced to hang. The sentences are carried out on 25 November 1988.

=== March ===
- March - Singapore's Permanent Representative to the United Nations, Ambassador Tommy Koh, assumes the presidency of the Third UN Conference on the Law of the Sea.

=== April ===
- 15 April – The Vanda Miss Joaquim is declared Singapore's national flower.

=== May ===
- 12 May – Singapore's second President Dr Benjamin Henry Sheares dies while in office. Speaker of Parliament Yeoh Ghim Seng temporarily serves as acting president during that time.
- 22 May – The Government of Singapore Investment Corporation is formed.

=== July ===
- 1 July – Changi Airport starts operation. On the same day, the former Paya Lebar Airport is handed over to the Republic of Singapore Air Force (RSAF), forming the Paya Lebar Air Base. The Air Base will also handle spillover traffic and emergencies too.
- 4 July – The National Crime Prevention Council is officially launched to prevent crime.

=== August ===
- 1 August – Nanyang Technological Institute is established to train engineers.
- 22 August – Changi Airport's second runway starts construction, which will be completed by mid-1984. The rest of Phase 2 will be finished by 1986.

=== September ===
- 1 September – The National Computer Board is formed to computerise the Civil Service and make Singapore an IT pioneer.
- 12 September – The new Singapore General Hospital is officially opened.
- 26 September – The Benjamin Sheares Bridge is officially opened. The bridge is part of the East Coast Parkway until 2013, when it becomes an arterial road.

=== October ===
- 16 October – The National Registration Office (NRO), the Registry of Citizens (ROC), the Registry of Births and Deaths (RBD), the Registry of Societies (ROS), and Martial Arts Control Unit (MACU) merged to form the National Registration Department (NRD).
- 23 October – C V Devan Nair becomes the third President of Singapore.
- 31 October – J. B. Jeyaretnam wins the 1981 Anson by-election, ending the People's Action Party's dominance in Parliament.

=== November ===
- 9 November – The Institute of Education moves out of Paterson Road, relocating to Bukit Timah.

=== December ===
- 29 December – Changi Airport is officially opened.
- 31 December – Singapore changed its time zone to UTC+08:00, celebrating New Year’s Day half an hour earlier at 11.30pm, when all clocks were set forward to 12 midnight.

== Births ==
- 29 January – Rui En, Actress.
- 27 March – JJ Lin, Singer.
- 17 July – Jeremy Chan, Actor.
- 25 July – Kaira Gong, Singer
- 17 August - Hong Junyang, Singer
- 4 October – Alfred Sim, Singer, winner of Project SuperStar (season 3).
- 5 October – Kelvin Tan, Singer.
- 15 November – Joanna Dong, Singer and third place of Sing! China (season 2).
- 10 December – Taufik Batisah, Singer, winner of Singapore Idol (season 1).

== Deaths ==
- 11 January – Malcolm MacDonald, 1st British Commissioner-General for Southeast Asia (b. 1901).
- 12 January – John Fearns Nicoll, 2nd Governor of Singapore (b. 1899).
- 11 February – Chan Choy Siong, female politician, women's rights activist, campaigner for Women's Charter (b. 1934).
- 1 March – Chua Toh Hua, entrepreneur and Chairman of the Nanyang Confucian Association (b. 1888).
- 3 March – Caralapati Raghaviah Dasaratha Raj, former Labour Party legislative assemblyman for Rochore Constituency (b. 1920).
- 12 May – Dr Benjamin Henry Sheares, 2nd President of Singapore (b. 1907).
- 17 November – Hsu Yun Tsiao, scholar of Overseas Chinese and Southeast Asian history (b. 1905).
- 24 November – Kwan Sai Kheong, Singaporean Ambassador to the Philippines and Vice-Chancellor of the National University of Singapore (b. 1920).
