= 1987 in Singapore =

- Decades: 1960s; 1970s; 1980s; 1990s; 2000s
- See also: Other events of 1987; Timeline of Singaporean history

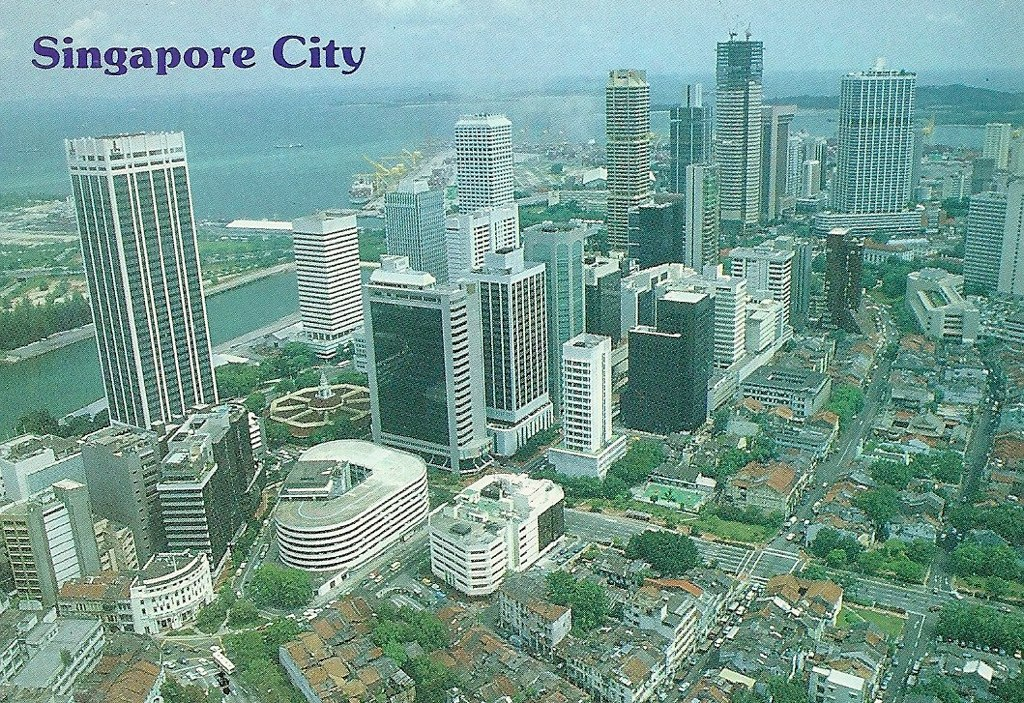
The city-centre of Singapore in 1987 in a postal card aerial view

The following lists events that happened during 1987 in Singapore.

== Incumbents ==
- President: Wee Kim Wee
- Prime Minister: Lee Kuan Yew

== Events ==
=== January ===
- 14 January – The Mandarin Oriental Singapore is officially opened.
- 24 January – The last nightsoil bucket system is phased out in Lorong Halus, signalling the beginning of complete modern sanitation in Singapore.

=== March ===
- 1 March – A new Have Three or More (if you can afford it) policy is announced to encourage people to have three or more children. This comes after significant decreases in population through the previous 'Stop at Two' policy of 1972.
- 6 March – The National Solidarity Party is formed.

=== April ===
- 3 April – The Housing and Development Board (HDB) introduces a new scheme for families with third children to upgrade to bigger flats. This comes after the new 'Have Three or More (if you can afford it)' policy is announced a month ago.

=== May ===
- 3 May – The first vertical marathon is held at Westin Stamford to raise funds for Community Chest.
- 9 May – The Bukit Timah Satellite Earth Station is officially opened.
- 15 May – The PSA Building is officially opened, serving as PSA's headquarters.
- 21 May – 21 people are arrested in Operation Spectrum for the Marxist conspiracy.

=== June ===
- 20 June – As part of Operation Spectrum, another 6 are detained, with 4 of the 16 arrested earlier released from detention.

=== July ===
- 11 July – Construction starts on Changi Airport's new Terminal 2, which will be linked to Terminal 1 via an automated people mover (now known as Changi Airport Skytrain).

=== August ===
- 6 August – SMRT Corporation is formed.
- 14 August – The Public Transport Council is formed to regulate public transport fares and standards.
- 26 August – The Van Kleef Aquarium reopens after an 18-month revamp.

=== September ===
- 2 September – The cleanup of the Singapore River was declared complete.
- 28 September – The $1 and 1-cent Second Series Coins are launched.

=== November ===
- 7 November – The initial section of the MRT, between Yio Chu Kang and Toa Payoh, was opened.
- 28 November – The Environment Building is officially opened as the Ministry of the Environment's (now Ministry of Sustainability and the Environment) headquarters, bringing together all of ENV's departments under one roof.

=== December ===
- 10 December – The Omniplanetarium (present-day Omni-Theatre) is officially opened.
- 12 December – The second section of the MRT was opened, stretching from Novena to Outram Park.
- 28 December – Singapore Indoor Stadium starts construction. When completed, it will help to enhance sports and entertainment events, which is completed in 1989.

== Births ==
- 22 January – Daphne Khoo, singer, contestant of Singapore Idol (Season 1).
- 12 March – Maxi Lim, actor.
- 18 May – Ya Hui, actress
- 6 August – Sezairi Sezali, singer, winner of Singapore Idol (Season 3).
- 5 October – Desmond Ng, singer-actor
- 11 October – Wang Weiliang, actor.
- Louis Chua – politician.

== Deaths ==
- 1 January – Phua Chye Long, Singaporean Chinese scholar, historian and publisher (b. 1904).
- 18 March – Simon Haigh David Elias, lawyer and former city councillor (b. 1916).
- 7 April – Ng Yeow Chong, former PAP Member of Parliament for Mountbatten Constituency (b. 1924).
- 16 August – Ho Yeow Koon, entrepreneur and founder of the Keck Seng Group of Companies (b. 1921).
- 8 September – Murray Buttrose, the last expatriate judge to serve in Singapore (b. 1903).
- 16 November – Zubir Said, composer of "Majulah Singapura" (b. 1907).
- 17 November – Lim Nang Seng, sculptor (b. 1917).
- 22 November – Soon Kia Seng, founding member of the Singapore Democratic Party and National Solidarity Party (b. 1927).
- 28 November – Goh Choo San, choreographer and ballet dancer (b. 1948).
