= J. M. Handy =

James Muttiah Handy (1869 — 8 November 1920) was a prominent Sri Lankan medical doctor who had an extensive practice in Singapore.

== Early life and education ==
Handy was born in Jaffna to Rev. T. P. Handy in 1869. He attended the St. John's College in Jaffna, and later the Trinity College in Kandy. He then attended the Ceylon Medical College. He travelled to England in 1917 to attend the University of Durham, where he obtained his M.D..

== Career ==
After graduating from college, he served in the Ceylon Medical Department for a few years. He then migrated to Singapore to start private practice, and was met with great success. He became the proprietor of the St. Mary's Dispensary and the president of both the Ceylon Tamil's Association and the Indian Christian Association, and was a member of the Straits Branch of the Royal Asiatic Society, the Raffles Centenary College Committee and the St. Andrew's Medical Mission. He was the president of the Singapore Family Benefit Society, a Visitor to the Lunatic Asylum, a member of the Rice Advisory Board, a lay reader of the St. Peter's Church and the director of the firm Proctor Brothers Ltd..

He built the Handy's Library at St. John's College in memory of his late brother, Rev. Charles Handy, who was the headmaster of the school. He also built the college's Fall Dormitory in memory of his tutor, Rev. Fall.

== Personal life and death ==
His first wife was educator, education administrator and cookbook author Ellice Handy. His second wife, Bridget Catherine Beatrice Chelvanathan Handy, was the founder of the Singapore Women's Club.

He died at his residence on 8 November 1920. Handy Road was named after him.
