= Edmund Victor Fowler =

Deputy Commissioner of the Criminal Investigation Department
- In office 1946–1950

Deputy Commissioner of Police
- In office 1950–1950
- Preceded by: Patrick Joseph Shannon

Personal details
- Born: 5 December 1895 Greenwich, London, England
- Died: 10 November 1950 (aged 54)
- Awards: CBE, KPM, CPM

Military service
- Allegiance: United Kingdom
- Years of service: 1914–1950

Edmund Victor Fowler CBE KPM CPM (5 December 1895 – 10 November 1950) was a law enforcement officer who served as Deputy Commissioner of the Criminal Investigation Department (Singapore) from 1946 to 1950 and Deputy Commissioner of Police (Singapore) in 1950.

== Career ==
Fowler joined the military in 1914 and was appointed to the Singapore Prison Service in 1919. He was promoted to the rank of probationary inspector in 1920, inspector in 1922, and assistant superintendent in 1931. From 1946 to 1950, Fowler served as Deputy Commissioner of the Criminal Investigation Department (Singapore). He was then appointed Deputy Commissioner of Police (Singapore).

Fowler was awarded the Colonial Police Medal (CPM) in 1941 and the King's Police Medal for Gallantry (KPM) in 1947. He was named a Commander of the Order of the British Empire (CBE) in the 1950 New Year Honours.

== Personal life ==
Fowler was born on 5 December 1895 in Greenwich, London, the son of Edmund Fowler and Eliza Mardell. In 1919, he married Gladys May Roberts in Kings Norton, England. The couple had one son and four daughters. In 1950, Fowler retired from the police force and left Singapore on a tour of Australia. He died on 10 November 1950 at sea.

== See also ==
- Deputy Commissioner of Police (Singapore)
