= 1986 in Singapore =

- Decades: 1960s; 1970s; 1980s; 1990s; 2000s
- See also: Other events of 1986; Timeline of Singaporean history

The following lists events that happened during 1986 in Singapore.

== Incumbents ==
- President: Wee Kim Wee
- Prime Minister: Lee Kuan Yew

== Events ==
=== January ===
- January – The Ministry of Education introduces a Single Session System for schools.
- 18 January – NETS was officially launched in Singapore, allowing people to pay electronically instead of using cash.

=== March ===
- 15 March – Hotel New World collapses, killing 33 people and leaving 17 injured.

=== June ===
- 17 June – The National University Hospital is officially opened.

=== July ===
- 8 July – The first MRT train is delivered to Bishan Depot.

=== September ===
- 1 September – The first Town Councils are established.

=== October ===
- 3 October – Raffles City, a mixed-use development, is officially opened. During the opening, several proposals to revamp tourism attractions are announced, including upgrading Haw Par Villa, enhancing historic areas like Chinatown and Bugis, a heritage link in the city, revamp of Sentosa and Fort Canning Park, and hosting more sports and cultural events.

=== November ===
- 13 November – Wisma Atria opens to the public.
- 18–20 November – Chaim Herzog visits Singapore.
- 30 November – The first episode of Crimewatch is shown on SBC 5.

== Births ==
- 5 May – Dawn Yeoh, actress.
- 5 August – Oon Shu An, actress and host.
- 19 August – Desmond Tan, actor.
- 26 September – Rebecca Lim, actress.
- 17 October – Nicole Seah, politician.

== Deaths ==
- 15 May – Chou Sing Chu, founder of Popular Bookstore (b. 1905).
- 2 June – Tan Soo Hock, Singapore's first eye surgeon (b. 1899).
- 15 September – William Goode, last Governor of Singapore (b. 1907).
- 23 September – Muttiah Doraisingham, first Asian to hold high office in the Ministry of Health during the colonial era (b. 1905).
- 15 October – Alex Josey, journalist and writer (b. 1910).
- 6 November – Maudrene Yap, ballet dancer and teacher (b. 1924).
- 7 November – Ibrahim Kipong, once the biggest Kampong Chief in Singapore and a centenarian (b. 1875).
- 19 November – Tan Chin Har, former editor-in-chief of the Nanyang Siang Pau (b. 1911).
- 14 December – Teh Cheang Wan, former Minister for National Development (b. 1928).
