= Zhuang Xiquan =

Chinese politician

Zhuang Xiquan (Chinese: 庄希泉; September 9, 1888 – May 14, 1988) was a Chinese male politician, who served as the vice chairperson of the Chinese People's Political Consultative Conference.
