= Portek =

Portek International Private Limited
- Type: Subsidiary
- Industry: Maritime transport
- Founded: Singapore (1988)
- Headquarters: Singapore
- Number of employees: c. 2,200
- Parent: Mitsui & Co.

Portek is a medium-sized terminal operator and port equipment engineering provider. The company is headquartered in Singapore with offices in over ten countries and employs 2,200 employees throughout Africa, Europe and Asia. Portek is a subsidiary of the Japanese conglomerate Mitsui & Co.

== History ==
Larry Lam founded Portek in 1988, initially focusing on port engineering and crane upgrading services. He saw an opportunity to provide services for and to market Bromma spreaders in the midst of rapid growth and expansion of the port business and of PSA Singapore. Thus Bromma Far East and at the same time Portek Systems were formed. Spurred on with 20%-30% growth each year, they expanded to provide port engineering support activities. As the company took on larger and larger projects, they became a contractor for used and surplus equipment which they relocated, sold and leased to third parties. In the late 1990s, Portek offered investment of their equipment in exchange for equity in the ports. Thus forming their evolution into port operations as a key business operation.

On 28 March 2002, Portek International was listed on the Singapore Exchange.

In 2011, Portek was acquired by Mitsui & Co. and was de-listed from the Singapore Exchange.

Portek is now a wholly owned subsidiary of Mitsui & Co.

== Board of directors ==
as at May 2019

- Chief executive officer: Eiichi Uriu
- Executive director and chief financial officer and chief affiliate management officer: Toshiki Ota
- Executive director and chief marketing officer: Liew Kok Leong
- Executive director and chief administrative officer: Yuji Taki
- Non-executive director: Takayuki Hori
- Non-executive director: Jun Yanagisawa

== Engineering ==
The engineering aspect of Portek focuses on mobilisation, modernization and modifications of used cranes, along with sales, leasing and distribution of components and parts (Straits Times, 2010). This arm accounts for 28.5% of the group's revenues in 2010.

As at May 2011, its total order book for port engineering projects dispersed around the globe, including countries like Algeria, Iraq, Indonesia, Thailand and its base Singapore, amounted to about $44 million.

== Port IT and automation ==
Portek's IT division provides Container Terminal Management Software, Vessel Traffic Management System, etc. for improving port productivity and efficiency.

== Acquisition ==
On 2 June 2011, Portek International Ltd made front-page news in The Business Times Singapore due to an unsolicited cash offer of S$1.20 by the Philippine listed post operator ICTSI for 100% of its shares. This represented a 69% premium over the last traded price, which was highest offer premium compared to other acquisition offers in Singapore, in recent times.

The company made headlines again when, on 9 June 2011, they released an announcement on the Singapore Exchange that there was a third party interested in making an offer to the company. Following the announcement, the Securities Industry Council stepped in with a deadline for the interested party to make its intentions clear: 50 days from after the ICTSI provides its offer document to Portek.

On 13 July 2011, Portek International Ltd announced that Mitsui & Co. had made an offer of S$1.40 for all Portek shares, representing a 17% premium than the offer of S$1.20 made by ICTSI. The deal values Portek at S$213.5 million is said to be in line with Mitsui's plans to expand its transportation logistics business in emerging markets. The acquisition will allow Mitsui immediate access to Portek's 8 terminals. Portek's chairman and directors along with key shareholders who collectively made up 50.05% of the company's shares had signed an irrevocable undertaking to sell their shares at the offer price of S$1.40.

After extending its offer to 10 August 2011 from the initial closing date of 20 July in to evaluate its options, ICTSI withdrew its initial offer on 1 August 2011

A formal offer was made by Mitsui & Co. on 27 July 2011. As of 2 August 2011, Mitsui & Co. owned 73.81% of the total amount of Portek International's shares.

The acquisition of 100% of Portek shares by Mitsui was announced in September 2011.

Portek is now a wholly owned subsidiary of Mitsui & Co.
