= Elephant statue =

Sculpture in Singapore

Coordinates: 1°17′19″N 103°51′03.6″E

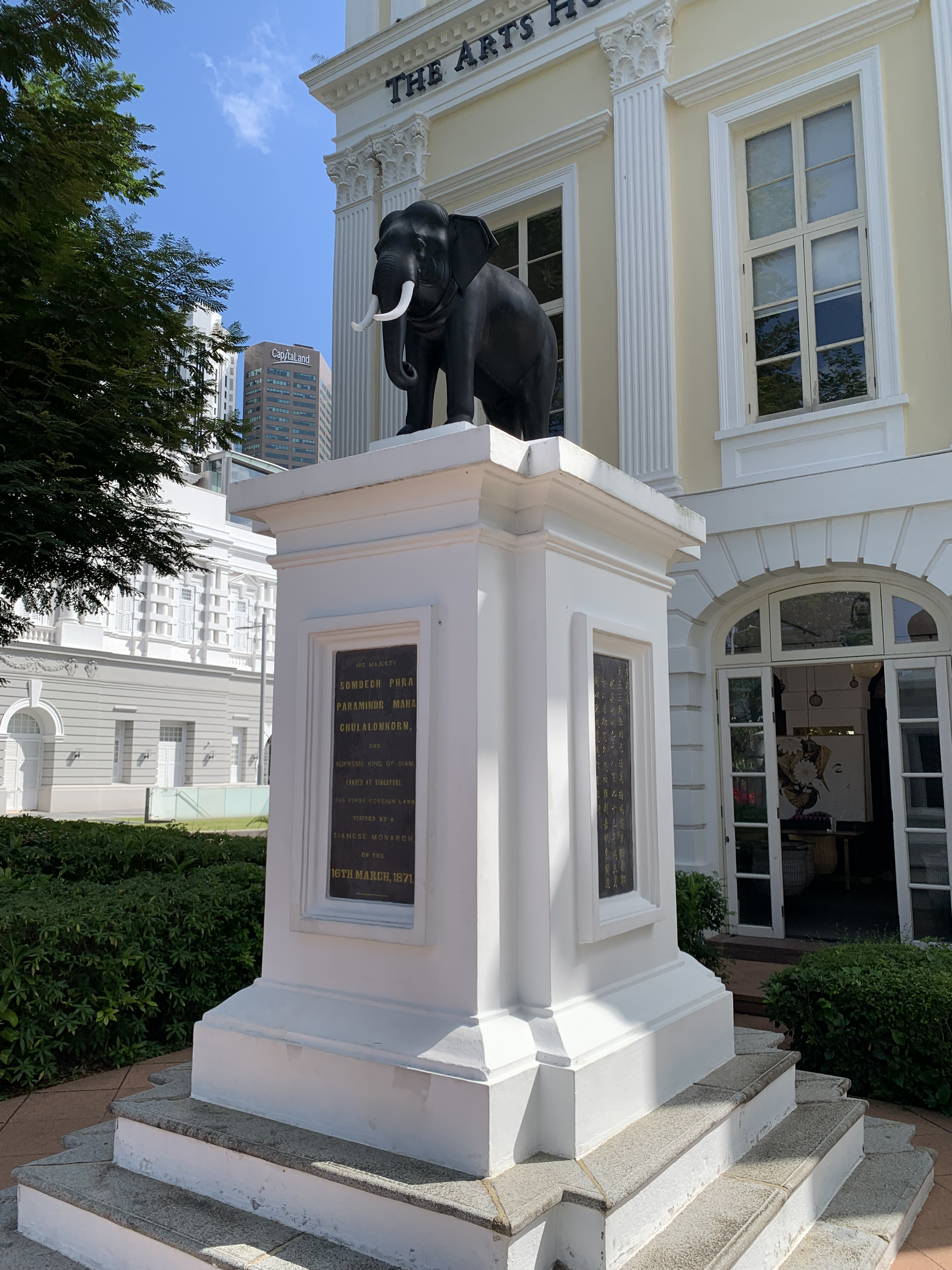
- The sculpture in 2025
- Medium: Bronze sculpture
- Location: Singapore

The Elephant statue, also known as the Thai Elephant, is a bronze sculpture in front of The Arts House along High Street of the Downtown Core area in Singapore.

== History ==
The statue was erected in front of the Victoria Memorial Hall on 25 June 1872 as a gift by King Chulalongkorn of Thailand to commemorate his 1871 visit to Singapore in the Straits Settlements. The statue was cast in bronze in Bangkok, and was mounted on a large pedestal. The inscriptions on the pedestal, which are in English, Chinese, Siamese, and Jawi, read, "His Majesty Somdetch Paramindr Maha Chulalongkorn, the Supreme King of Siam, landed at Singapore, the first foreign land visited by a Siamese Monarch, on the 16th March, 1871".

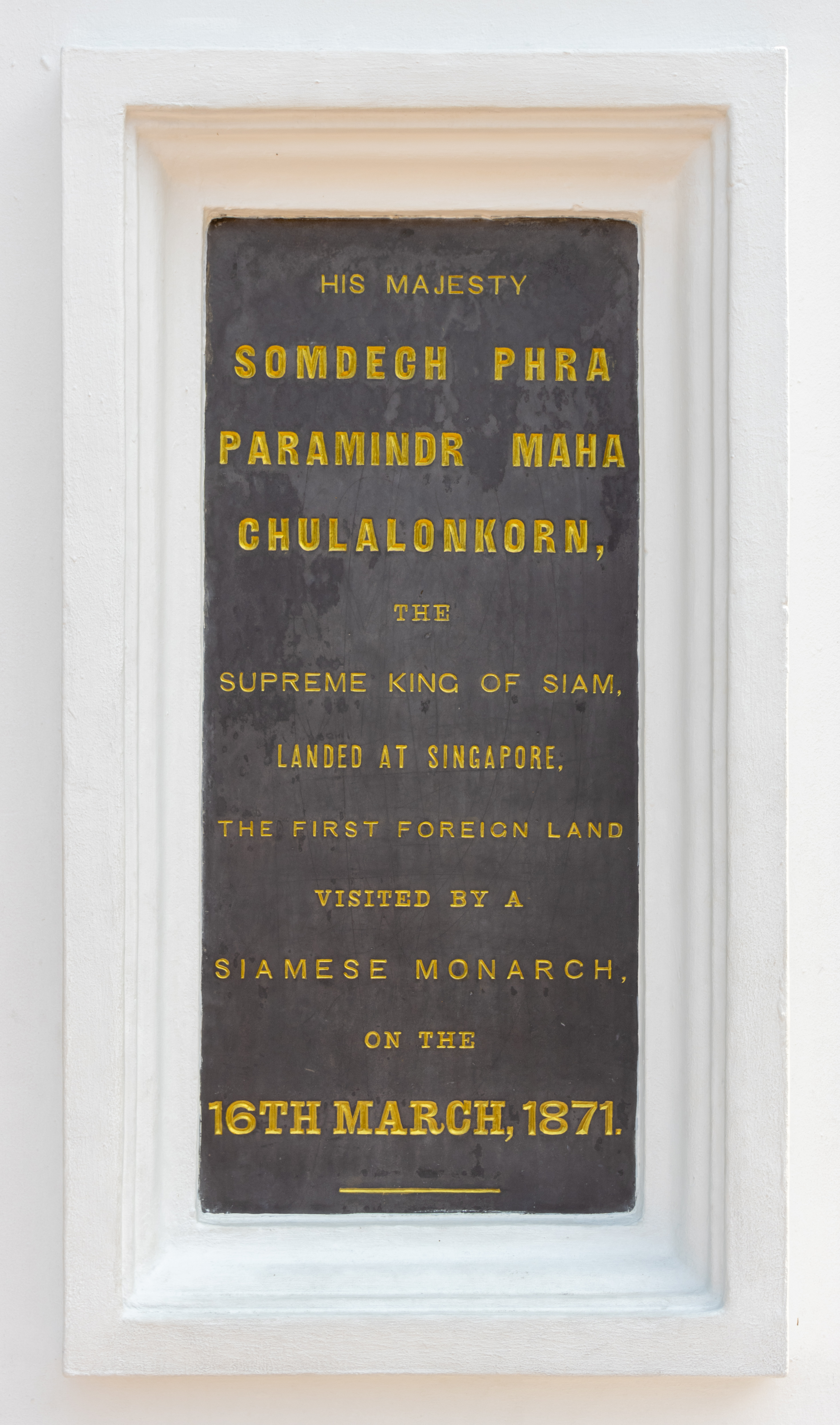
English

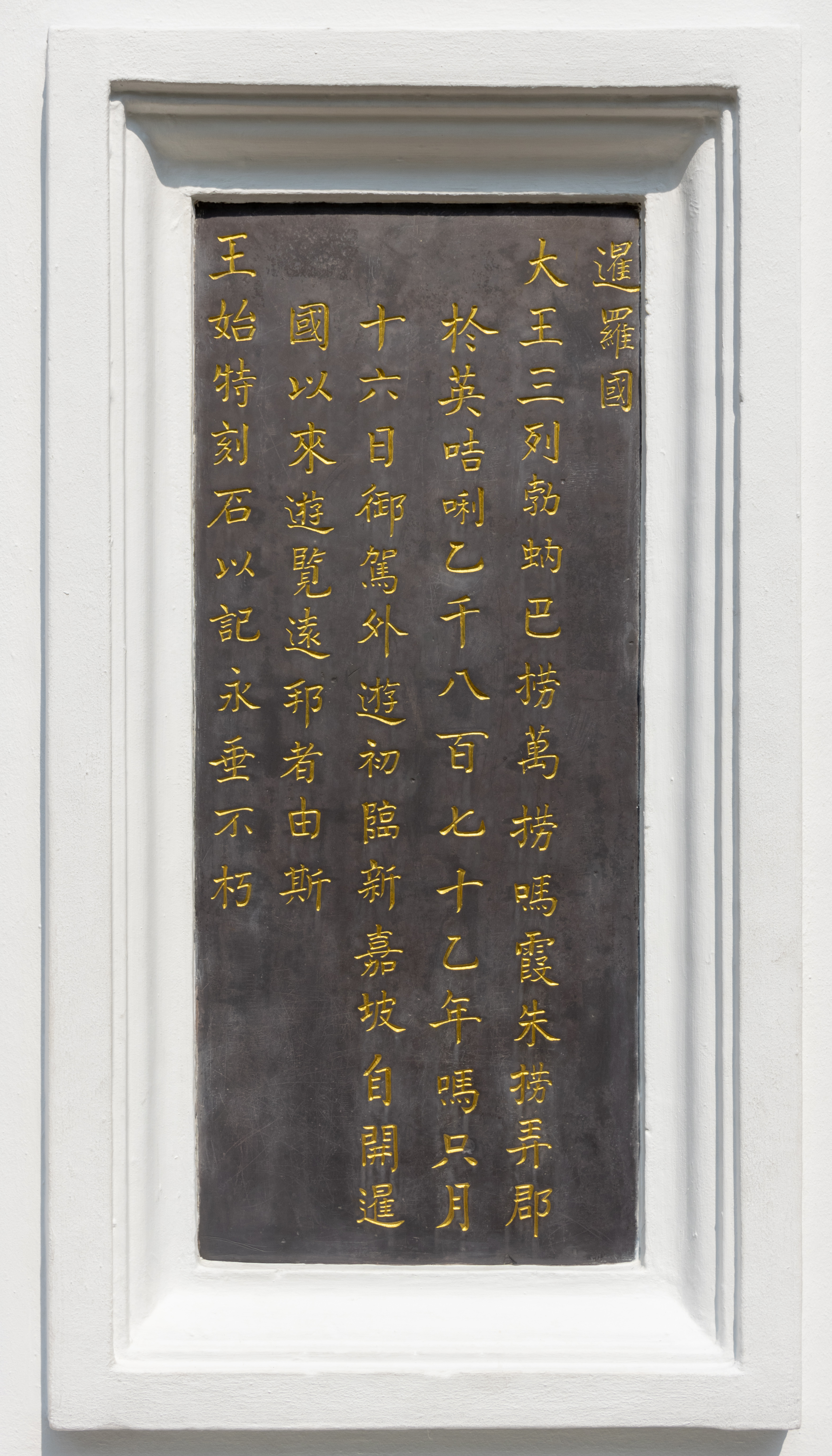
Chinese

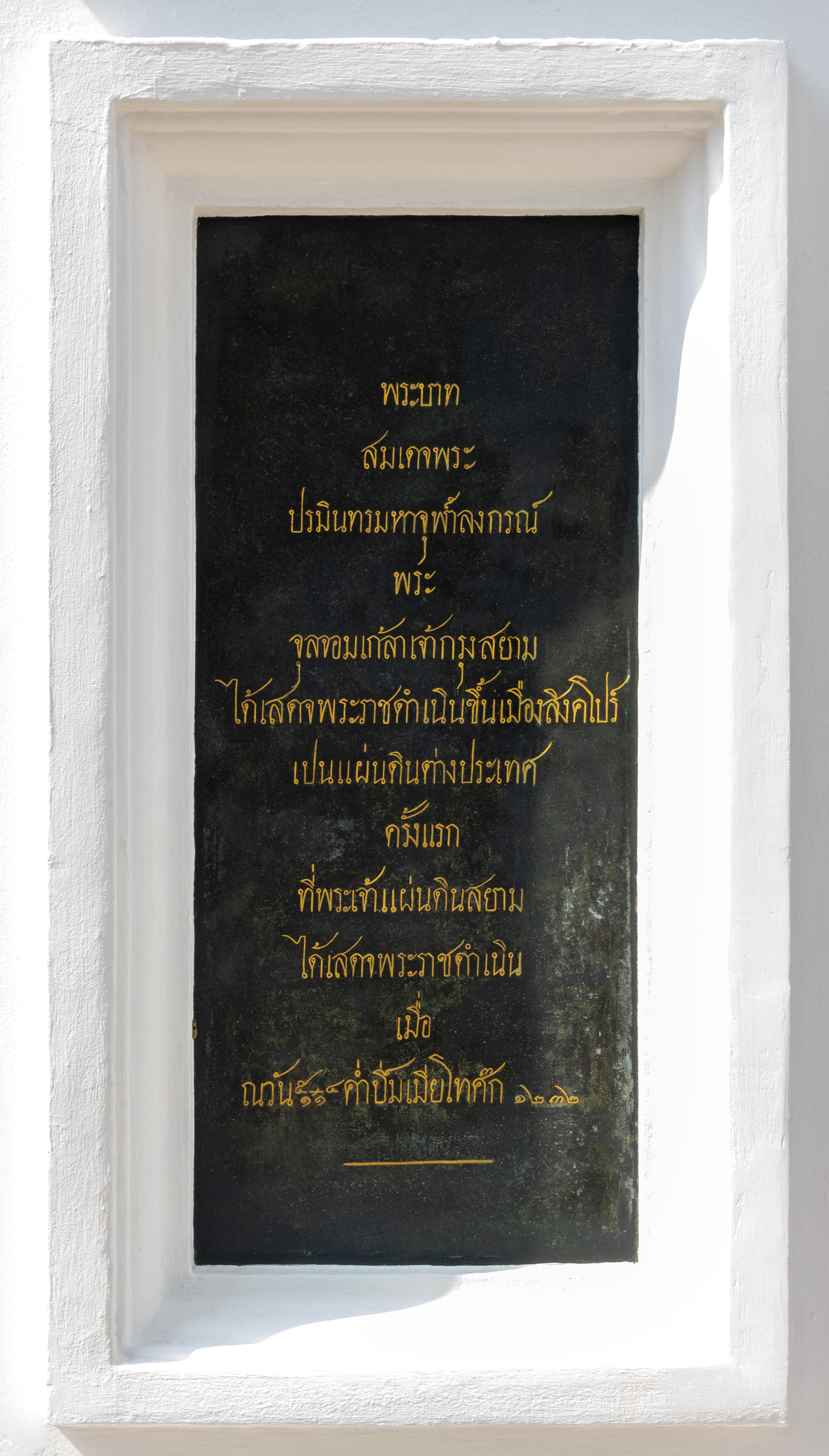
Thai

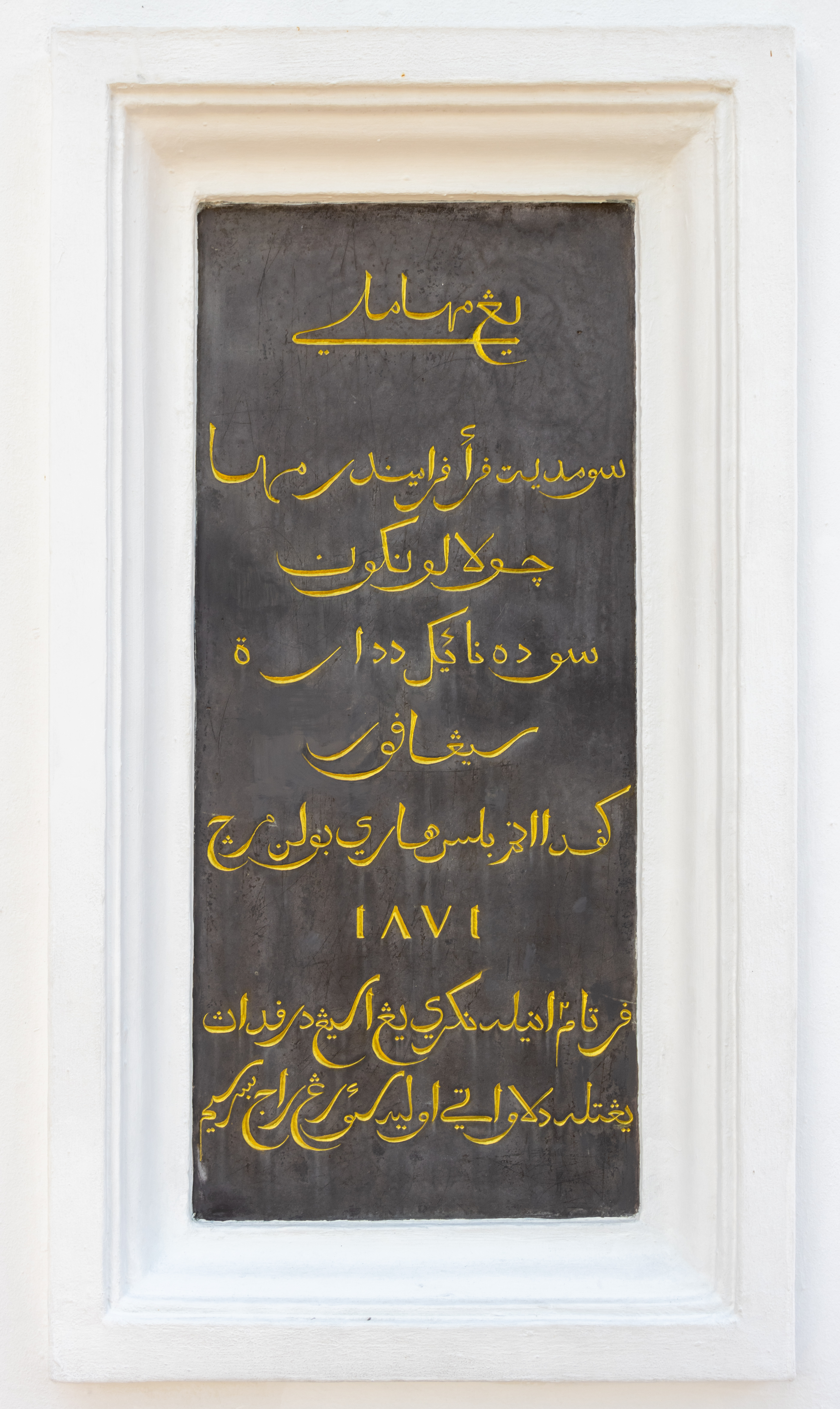
Jawi

== See more ==
- National Museum of Indonesia, where located another elephant statue of the King in Indonesia
