= Lim Yong Liang =

Singaporean footballer (1900–1982)

Lim Yong Liang MBE (1 December 1900 – 29 October 1982) was a Singaporean football player and manager.

== Playing career ==
=== Club career ===
Lim started playing football while studying at St. Joseph's Institution. While studying, Lim started playing for White Star XI in 1919. In 1920, Lim Kee Cheok, one of the founders of the Straits Chinese Football Association (SCFA), spotted him and Lim joined his club. He became a regular player for SCFA and then captained the team.

In 1924, Lim captained the Batavia team which won the Java Football Championship held in Batavia, Dutch East Indies (present day Jakarta, Indonesia).

Lim played as a striker.

Lim retired from football at the end of the 1934 football season.

=== International career ===
In 1922, Lim was selected to the Singapore national team playing in the Malaya Cup and represented Singapore for six editions (1923, 1925 to 1929) of the Cup. The team reached the finals in all six editions.

== Managerial career ==
From 1933 to 1940, Lim coached the Chinese teams in Singapore. He also coached the Singapore team for the Malaya Cup from 1936 till 1942 when the Japanese invaded Singapore.

Lim managed the Singapore national team.

== Post-football career ==
From 1945 to 1965, Lim was the secretary of the Singapore Amateur Football Association.

== Honours ==
- Member of the Order of the British Empire: 1959
