= Toh Aik Choon =

Malaysian-Singaporean entrepreneur

- 杜億春 Toh Aik Choon in Atlanta, Georgia. (circa 1987)
- Born: 26 July 1927; Penang, Malaya
- Died: 13 September 1990 (aged 63); Republic of Singapore
- Citizenship: Singapore
- Education: Chung Ling High School, Penang
- Occupations: Trader; Entrepreneur
- Spouse: Khoo Lay Kee
- Children: Serene Toh; Merlene Toh James Toh

Toh Aik Choon

Chinese name
- Traditional Chinese: 杜億春
- Jyutping: Dou6 Jik1 Ceon1
- Hokkien POJ: Tō͘ Ek-chhun

Toh Aik Choon (Chinese: 杜億春; Pe̍h-ōe-jī: Tō͘ Ek-chhun) (1927–1990), was a Malaysian-Singaporean entrepreneur. He was born in the Malayan seaport of Penang in 1927 as the youngest child in a family of three. A.C. attended the Chung Ling High School in Penang before his education was disrupted by the Second World War.

== Career ==
=== 1960s ===
He worked for the Sim Lim Trading Co. in Penang, before transferring to the Singapore head office in 1952, after his marriage to Khoo Lay Kee.

By 1962, Aik Choon had become managing director of Sim Lim Co. Ltd, which was listed on the Singapore Stock Exchange. Aik Choon was instrumental in many of the joint venture industrial enterprises that Sim Lim commenced in that period. In particular, he was Director of Malayan Shipbreakers Ltd. 1961(Singapore's first ship breaking company), Chairman of Pan Malaysia Paint Industry Ltd (1962–65), and a founding director of Nippon Paint (S) Co. Pte Ltd (1965–75), National Iron and Steel Mills Ltd (1964), Malayan Iron and Steel Mills Ltd (1968), Decola (S) Ltd, and director of Sim Lim Investments Ltd (n.k.a Pacific Century Regional Development Limited).

=== 1970s ===
Aik Choon left Sim Lim in 1969 to start his own company, A.C.T. Enterprises Pte Ltd, which became a holding company for various joint ventures he started. Capitalizing on the first wave of Japanese investment into South East Asia in the 1970s, he started numerous manufacturing and trading joint ventures during this period, including Fujitec Singapore Corporation Ltd, Hitachi (Singapore) Pte Ltd, Hitachi Consumer Products (S) Pte Ltd, Nissei Sangyo (S) Pte Ltd, Hitachi Consumer Products (Malaysia) Sdn Bhd, Hitachi Cable (S) Pte Ltd, and Toyo Metal Products (S) Pte Ltd.

=== 1980s ===
He was also an early investor in the US real estate market, where he started developing industrial land in Dekalb County, Georgia, through the Atlanta International Industrial Park. In 1987 he started A.C.T. Investments, Inc. together with Peter E. Chang. The company's first project was the development of the 36 storey luxury apartments, the Grandview in Buckhead, Atlanta.

In joint venture with China Travel Services, A.C. Toh started CTS' first US headquarters in Atlanta in 1988. The Atlanta office started organizing group tours from continental USA to China in 1989

In the early 80s, Aik Choon was energized by the potential of the China market, and worked relentlessly to bring foreign investors and consultants to the People's Republic of China. In 1984, he started the Tianjin International Technology Consulting Centre (ITC) in Tianjin, in collaboration with the Science and Technology Commission. ITC became the first sino-foreign joint venture consulting company, with a no-dividend policy for 50 years. He became an honorary citizen of Atlanta and the State of Georgia, and was posthumously awarded honorary citizenship of the City of Tianjin, and the prestigious Friendship Award by the State Department of the People's Republic of China.

A.C. Toh died in September 1990, age 63, survived by his wife and three children, Serene, Merlene and James.
