= Lee Dai Sor =

Singaporean broadcaster (1913–1989)

Lee Dai Sor (Note: Chinese: 李大傻; pinyin: Lǐ Dàshǎ; Jyutping: Lei5 Daai6-so4; also romanised as Lee Dai Soh or Li Dasha.) (born Lee Fook Hong; Chinese: 李福鴻; Jyutping: Lei5 Fuk1-hung4; 1913 – 23 March 1989) was a Singaporean broadcaster who served as a Cantonese storyteller for Rediffusion from 1949 to 1982.

== Early life and education ==
Lee Fook Hong was born in 1913 in Telok Blangah, Singapore. He was the third of five sons. Lee's father, Li Geng, was a Guangdong-born steel burner repairman who became relatively prosperous after working for the Port of Singapore Authority. However, Li Geng returned to China and reportedly died of insanity after his wife (and Lee's mother) died giving birth.

Following their parents' deaths, Lee's elder brothers became his primary caretakers. Lee was educated at Yeung Ching School until Secondary Two, when the school ceased to provide secondary education. Thereafter, Lee attended the Anglo-Chinese Continuation School but dropped out midway to begin working odd jobs.

== Career ==
In 1938, at a friend's suggestion, Lee successfully applied to be a storyteller for the Chinese arm of Radio Malaya, thus becoming the first such broadcaster in all of Malaya and Singapore. Lee adopted the Cantonese stage name "Lee Dai Sor" (Chinese: 李大傻; literally "Lee Big Fool"), which subsequently became his legal name after authorities mistook him for another Lee Fook Hong and accused him of tax evasion. Lee Dai Sor's debut programme, titled Tantian Shuodi (Chinese: 談天說地; literally "Talking About Heaven and Earth"), was broadcast every Sunday morning from 09:30 to 09:45. It ran for three decades and was one of the most successful shows in the broadcasting history of Singapore.

In 1949, Lee joined Rediffusion as a Cantonese storyteller, while his colleagues Ong Toh and Ng Chia Keng told stories in Hokkien and Teochew respectively. Lee was especially known for his narration of wuxia. His stories were broadcast not only in Singapore, but also in Malaysia, Hong Kong, and Australia. Although they appealed to listeners, these storytelling broadcasts were abruptly cancelled following the introduction of the nationwide Speak Mandarin Campaign in 1979, which discouraged the use of Chinese dialects in favour of Mandarin Chinese.

In the 1980s, Lee began writing columns in Chinese-language newspapers and selling recordings of his stories, while occasionally telling stories in public, sometimes even in self-described "imperfect" Mandarin. In 1984, Lee's autobiography was published.

Lee was also a Cantonese opera actor but retired in 1984 because of rheumatism.

== Death ==
Around 17:00 on 23 March 1989, Lee suffered a heart attack at his Havelock Road residence and died at the age of 77. He was survived by his two wives, Wong Chow Foon and Meng Yeow Hon, and their three children.

== Legacy ==
Shortly after Lee's death, Singaporean playwright Kuo Pao Kun remarked that "the value of Lee's art could not be refuted". In 2007, Singapore-based theatre company Toy Factory staged a musical based on Lee's life, titled Lee Dai Soh.
