= Ellice Handy =

Singaporean educator (1902–1989)

- Born: Ellice Zuberbuhler; 1902; Singapore
- Died: 30 May 1989 (aged 86–87); Eastwood, South Australia
- Occupations: teacher, education administrator, cookbook author
- Years active: 1922-1964
- Known for: writing the first cookbook of local cuisines in Singapore
- Notable work: My Favourite Recipes

Ellice Handy, OBE (1902–1989) was a Singaporean educator, education administrator and author of Singapore's first cookbook on local cuisine. Her cookbook is the longest-selling compilation of recipes in Singapore and is considered a must-have volume by many cooks. She was inducted into the Singapore Women's Hall of Fame in 2015.

== Early life ==
Ellice Zuberbuhler was born in 1902 to a racially mixed family. In 1904, she became a boarder at the Methodist Girls' School (MGS), along with her older sister Anne, who passed her Cambridge Examinations in 1915, a year before Ellice passed her own exams at the age of fourteen. In 1917, Zuberbuhler began studying Latin at the Isabella Thoburn College in Lucknow, India, as a merit scholar. After a year of study, she enrolled in the Bachelor of Arts programme, graduating with honours in 1922.

== Career ==
Upon completion of her degree, Zuberbuhler returned to Singapore and began teaching at MGS that same year. Her instruction included Biblical knowledge, English and history. In 1937, Zuberbuhler became engaged to Dr. James Muttiah Handy, a doctor of Ceylonese heritage, after whom Handy Road in Singapore is named. The couple had one daughter, Helen, and Handy returned to teaching. In 1941 during World War II, the school was disrupted for three and a half years and sustained significant damage to its property. In 1945, Handy began serving as principal of the MGS, the first Asian to hold the position, and the following year restarted the secondary classes which had been suspended during the Japanese occupation. Between 1950 and 1952, she designed and spearheaded construction, with the assistance of Nathalie Means, on the new school building.

In 1952, she published the first comprehensive cookbook in Singapore, My Favourite Recipes, to raise funds for the MGS. The recipes covered a broad range of cuisines, including chapters on Chinese, European, Indian, Indonesian, and Malayan dishes, and Handy became well known in Malaysia and Singapore. While there had been earlier cookbooks printed by organizations for their membership, these usually were adaptations of European dishes with ingredients locally available in Singapore. Asian dishes were typically passed by word of mouth from mother to daughter. Handy was a home cook, who used Asian methods, like steaming and stir-frying, utensils, locally available produce and included those processes in her book. She encouraged her readers to experiment with the recipes to meet their own families' tastes.

On 20 July 1957, Handy was awarded the Order of the British Empire for her work in education. She returned to teaching in 1957, resigning from her post as principal, and retired in 1964. After her retirement, Handy wrote articles for Female, a local women's magazine, mostly about cooking and updated the recipes in her book for subsequent publications. In 1982, Handy's husband died and five years later, Handy moved to Australia to be near her daughter.

== Death and legacy ==
Handy died on 30 May 1989 in Eastwood, South Australia and was buried at Centennial Park Cemetery, Pasadena, South Australia. Handy's cookbook has gone into eleven editions, the most recent being published in 2012 and is the longest selling cookbook in Singapore. The recipe collection is considered "the Bible" of local cooks and spawned a wave of others to publish cookbooks. In 2015, Handy was inducted into the Singapore Women's Hall of Fame.
