= Low Kway Song =

Singaporean artist (1889–1982)

Low Kway Song, Lynx, 1921, Oil on canvas, 58.5 x 45 cm

Low Kway Song (simplified Chinese: 刘溪松; traditional Chinese: 劉溪松; pinyin: Liú Xīsōng; 1889 – 8 December 1982) was a Singapore-born visual artist, performing artist, and cleric.

== Early artistic career ==
Low and his elder brother, Low Kway Soo, were early members of the Singapore Amateur Drawing Society, which was founded in 1909; the younger Low was its honorary art instructor from 1911 to 1913.Low's contributions to the Amateur Drawing Association were recognised in 1916, when Dr. Lim Boon Keng presented him with a gold medal during the association's anniversary celebration. In 1918, he founded and began drawing cartoons for The Eastern Quarterly Review, a quarterly magazine that published illustrated articles on trade and other regional interests; it ceased publication in 1922.

Low also took part in the Singapore Fine Art Exhibition in 1929, alongside other artists working in Singapore at the time. The exhibition brought together artists from different backgrounds and contributed to the development of Singapore's early art scene.

== Artistic works ==
Most of Low's painted works were privately commissioned. He was paid $3500 to paint an oil portrait of Chinese Indonesian tycoon Oei Tiong Ham, which was republished in the Malayan Saturday Post after Oei's death in 1924. This reportedly made Low the first painter in Singapore to receive a four-figure commission. Low painted portraits of several other noted personalities throughout his career, including Aw Boon Haw, Rabindranath Tagore, and Tan Jiak Kim. Low also painted a portrait of Sun Yat-sen. The image was later reproduced on postcards, which were sold to collect donations for Sun's revolutionary movement.

His Lynx (1921) and Thai Temple (1923), both of which were painted during his extended stay in Bangkok, are some of the few surviving early 20th-century oil paintings from Singapore.Another of Low's early works is Portrait of Man in Three Piece Suit with Orchid on Lapel (1917). The painting shows a man dressed in a Western-style suit with an orchid on his lapel. His clothing reflects the influence of Western fashion on Straits Chinese society during this period.

== Other cultural activities ==
A founding member of the Singapore Amateur Musical and Dramatic Association, Low was both a playwright and stage actor. Low and his brother also owned a photography studio on Stamford Road.In addition, Low took the advice of the school’s former principal, Mr. Philip, and opened the Raffles Art Studio on Bras Basah Road.

Low founded the first Straits Chinese Methodist Church in Malacca and became its pastor in 1940. He subsequently began to produce biblically-themed works, including two paintings of Jesus in the Garden of Gethsemane and one painting of Jesus' crucifixion. He formally retired in February 1954, but remained active as a cleric and continued to paint for leisure at home. Low died on 8 December 1982, aged 94.
