= Deputy Commissioner of Police (Singapore) =

Deputy Commissioner of the Singapore Police Force
- Incumbent; Alvin Moh (Operations); Teo Chun Ching (Policy); Zhang Wei Han (Investigation and Intelligence)
- Singapore Police Force
- Abbreviation: DC
- Reports to: Minister for Home Affairs
- Appointer: President of Singapore
- Term length: No term limit
- First holder: Kenneth Bruce Stewart

The Deputy Commissioner of Police is the deputy head of the Singapore Police Force (SPF).

== List of Deputy Commissioners of Police ==
Deputy Commissioner of Police	Term	Ref
Kenneth Bruce Stewart	1860s	
Patrick Joseph Shannon	1947–1950	
Edmund Victor Fowler	1950	
Song Kok Hoo	1959–1961	
John Le Cain	1962–1963	
A. T. Rajah	1963–1966	
Khoo Boon Hui	1995–1997	
Goh Liang Kwang	1997–2008	
Wong Hong Kuan	2010–2011	
Raja Kumar s/o Thamby Rajah	2011–2014	
Hoong Wee Teck (Investigation & Intelligence)	2013–2014	
Lim Kok Thai (Policy)	2015–2018	
Tan Chye Hee (Investigations & Intelligence)	2015–2018	
Lau Peet Meng (Operations)	2015–2018	
Jerry See Buck Thye (Policy)	2018–2024	
Florence Chua Siew Lian (Investigations & Intelligence)	2018–2022	
Tan Chye Hee (Operations)	2018–2019	
Tan Hung Hooi (Operations)	2019–2022	
How Kwang Hwee (Investigations & Intelligence)	2022–2024	
Lian Ghim Hua (Operations)	2022–2025	
How Kwang Hwee (Policy)	2024–2026	
Zhang Wei Han (Investigations & Intelligence)	since 2024	
Alvin Moh Tser Loong (Operations)	since 2025	
Teo Chun Ching (Policy)	since 2026	
