= 2008 in Singapore =

- Decades: 1980s; 1990s; 2000s; 2010s; 2020s
- See also: Other events of 2008; Timeline of Singaporean history

The following lists events that occurred in 2008 in the Republic of Singapore.

== Incumbents ==
- President: S.R. Nathan
- Prime Minister: Lee Hsien Loong

== Events ==
=== January ===
- 1 January – All radio stations in Singapore start broadcasting 24/7.
- 2 January – The School of the Arts is opened, making it the first specialised pre-tertiary arts school in Singapore.
- 3 January – The Keppel Bay Bridge is officially opened.
- 8 January
  - My Paper is relaunched as a full-fledged bilingual newspaper.
  - Asia Netcom and Pacific Internet successfully merged as Pacnet, Singapore's second ISP. This resulted in its delisting from Nasdaq.
  - Reflections at Keppel Bay starts construction works, with completion by 2013.
- 9 January – Singapore Changi Airport Terminal 3 starts operations.
- 14 January – The Athletes Achievement Awards is launched to recognise Paralympians. The awards are 10 per cent that of the Multi-million dollar Award Programme for Olympians, being launched 15 years ago.
- 18 January – The Land Transport Gallery is launched. Several enhancements are announced for buses. Among them, the Land Transport Authority will centrally plan bus routes by 2009 with Public Transport Council overseeing bus networks and service quality, 80% of bus services at timings of 10 minutes or less by August 2009, more seamless transfers, distance-based fares by 2009 to remove transfer penalties, an integrated season pass, more bus lanes, pilot bus priority at traffic junctions and mandatory give-way at bus bays by end-2008, seven more integrated bus interchanges, more information panels at 20 bus stops and SMS for bus arrival times, an enhanced Integrated Public Transport Journey Planner by July 2008 and an Integrated Multi-Modal Travel Information System to be developed. Bus services will be made contestable and more niche services will be provided. A community division is set up in LTA with a new programme soon.
- 19 January –
  - Marina at Keppel Bay is officially opened as a yacht facility with world-class restaurants.
  - The Sports Hub project tender is awarded to Singapore Sports Hub Consortium led by Dragages Singapore Pte Ltd.
- 23 January – The National University Health System is formed as Singapore's third health cluster.
- 25 January
  - Several new rail lines are announced to double the network from 138 km (86 miles) today to 278 km (173 miles) by 2020 as part of refreshed transport plans.
  - The Thomson Line and Eastern Region Line will finish by 2018 and 2020 respectively, and new extensions on the North South and East West Lines will finish by 2015, serving the new cruise centre in Marina South and Tuas area respectively. Downtown Line Stage 3 will be brought forward by two years from 2018 to 2016 (a year after Stage 2 opens). Circle Line Stage 3 will open a year earlier in mid-2009, with two stations (Thomson and West Coast) opening with the whole line after initial plans as shell stations. The Circle Line extension serving Marina Bay will open in 2012.
  - There will also be 93 more train trips per week on the North South, East West and North East Lines during peak periods from February 2008, with more train capacity for the North South and East West Lines by 2012.
  - Platform screen doors will be installed on all above ground stations to boost safety and reduce track intrusions, with the installation make more cost-effective after usage in many countries. It will start with test pilots in Yishun, Jurong East and Pasir Ris in 2009 before a rollout to all stations in 2012.
  - The rail financing framework will also be reviewed for greater rail expansion by allowing a network approach in evaluating feasibility of new lines instead of a line approach, as well as ensure greater contestability of rail operators by having shorter licence terms at 10 to 15 years instead of 30 currently, and having operators compete to run rail lines and meet service obligations.
  - In other transport plans, 86 percent of overhead bridges will be covered by 2010, with all transport walkways made barrier-free too. 40 percent of buses will be wheelchair accessible by 2010, with the entire fleet by 2020. There will also be 17 more lifts for 16 MRT stations to boost convenience, with more than 70 percent of MRT stations having at least two access routes by end 2011. Public transport fares will continue to be regulated for affordability, including for those lower-income.
  - For taxis, Quality of Standards for call bookings will be tightened to ensure availability, along with setting up a common booking number by July.
  - For cyclists, a six-month trial will start from March to allow foldable bikes on trains and buses. Park connectors will be leveraged to allow cyclists to get to public transport interchanges more easily, along with improving bike parking facilities at MRT stations and bus interchanges in housing estates. Signs will also be put up to alert motorists of cyclists in frequently-used routes from March, with trials started to allow cycling on pedestrian walkways in Tampines.
  - Transport fleet standards will be improved for the environment, with all taxis complying with Euro IV by 2014, and 40 percent of public buses doing so in 2010; and the rest by 2020.

=== February ===
- 1 February – The Employment and Employability Institute (e2i) is officially launched to help workers find jobs. In addition, a National Continuing Education and Training (CET) Masterplan is launched too.
- 8 February – Sumatran orangutan Ah Meng, known for a tourism icon of Singapore, dies after 97 Orangutan Years, or 47 years.
- 21 February- The President of IOC, Jacques Rogge announces that Singapore will host the inaugural 2010 Summer Youth Olympics, which happened on 14 August 2010.
- 27 February – Mas Selamat bin Kastari, one of Singapore's wanted fugitive, has escaped from detention under the country's Internal Security Act.

=== March ===
- 1 March – Opening of Singapore Flyer; at 165 metres (541 ft) in height, it surpasses Star of Nanchang's height of 160 metres (520 ft) as the tallest Ferris Wheel at the time until on 31 March 2014, where High Roller's height of 160 metres (520 ft) surpasses the record.
- 4 March – A new School of Science and Technology, Singapore will be set up by 2010.
- 6 March – A 43-year-old murder suspect is shot dead by police officers at Outram Park MRT station along the North East MRT line. This comes after the suspect attempted to lunge at two officers with a knife as they checked him.
- 7 March – The Underground Ammunition Facility is commissioned for underground storage of ammunition, saving land aboveground.
- 8 March – Playground @ Big Splash opens, replacing the previous Big Splash waterpark.
- 30 March – The Land Transport Master Plan 2008 is launched.
- 31 March – Changi Airport Terminal 3's shopping and dining facilities are launched.

=== April ===
- 1 April –
  - The Workplace Safety and Health Council is formed to raise workplace safety and health standards.
  - Alexandra Health is formed as Singapore's fourth healthcare cluster, which moved to Khoo Teck Puat Hospital in 2010.
- 2 April – The Casino Regulatory Authority of Singapore is formed to regulate casinos after its legalization in 2005.
- 11 April – Wessex Village Square @ one-north is launched, providing a space for art exhibitions and works to be shown.
- 28 April – During the Workplace Safety and Health Council launch, a target to reduce fatality rate is announced to bring it down to 1.8 per 100,000 workers by 2018.
- 30 April – SMRT launches the SMRT is Green campaign to promote sustainability, with a new Euro 5 bus launched too. Several new eco-friendly vehicles will be put on the road soon.

=== May ===
- 10 May – HortPark, Henderson Waves and Alexandra Arch are officially opened as part of a plan to link the Southern Ridges.
- 23 May – The International Court of Justice (ICJ) awards Pedra Branca to Singapore and Middle Rocks to Malaysia, ending a 29-year territorial dispute between the two countries.
- 28 May – The Land Transport Authority has announced that there are no plans to develop the Jurong LRT for now due to the lack of demand.

=== June ===
- 23 June – The Singapore National Paralympic Council is formed to focus on para athletes.
- 27 June – Phase 2B of Fusionopolis (known as Solaris) starts construction.

=== July ===
- 5 July – DigiPen's Singapore campus is officially opened, the first international location.
- 11 July –
  - The Land Transport Authority announced that another platform will be built at Jurong East MRT station called the Jurong East Modification Project. It is targeted for completion by 2012, but eventually opened earlier on 27 May 2011. 17 more trains will also be added.
  - The Reform Party is inaugurated.
  - The F1 Pit Building is completed in preparation of the Singapore Grand Prix.
- 15 July – The locations of the stations along Downtown MRT line Stage 2 are unveiled.
- 25 July – Changi Airport Terminal 3 is officially opened. Plans for Terminal 4 are announced to allow Changi Airport to expand its capacity.
- 31 July –
  - Money No Enough 2 is released, 10 years after Money No Enough is out in cinemas.
  - Radio Singapore International ceases transmission due to declining listenership.

=== August ===
- 8 – 24 August – Team Singapore took part in the 2008 Summer Olympics in Beijing. The team won only one silver Olympic medal (for the Women's Table Tennis team event) during the run, the first time the nation won a medal after 48 years after its first medal- also a silver—by Tan Howe Liang in the 1960 Summer Olympics, placing 72nd out of 87 NOCs.
- 20 August – Pro-family policies are enhanced to encourage child-bearing. Several of these measures include tax reliefs, kindergarten education, 16 weeks for maternity leave and six-day childcare leave for each parent from 1 January 2009, a six-day unpaid infant care leave, Government co-funding for assisted reproductive technology from 1 September, among others.
- 24 August – The MacRitchie Viaduct extension opens to traffic, supposed to open last month.
- 26 August – The Provisional Admission Exercise will be merged into the Joint Admission Exercise after moves to shorten marking of exams, first announced in 2006. The move will take effect in 2009.
- 28 August – Changi Airport Terminal 3's Butterfly Garden is opened.

=== September ===
- 1 September – The Singapore Pharmacy Council is formed, replacing the previous Singapore Pharmacy Board.
- 5 September – The Murai Urban Training Facility is officially opened, making it the SAF's first such facility.
- 6 – 17 September – Team Singapore took part in the 2008 Summer Paralympics in Beijing.
  - 9 September – Equestrian rider Laurentia Tan wins Singapore's first-ever Paralympic medal, a bronze. She wins another bronze medal on 11 September.
  - 13 September – Swimmer Yip Pin Xiu wins Singapore's first Paralympic silver medal. She wins Singapore's first Paralympic gold medal on 15 September.
- 20 September – The Kallang-Paya Lebar Expressway is opened.
- 26 September – Construction starts on a second tower beside OUB Centre, which will be completed by 2011. The building is officially opened in 2012.
- 28 September – Singapore held a leg of the 2008 Formula One World Championship, called the SingTel Singapore Grand Prix; it was the first time the F1 Grand Prix was held in Singapore, and the first F1 race held at night.
- End September – Singapore slips into the 2008 financial crisis.

=== October ===
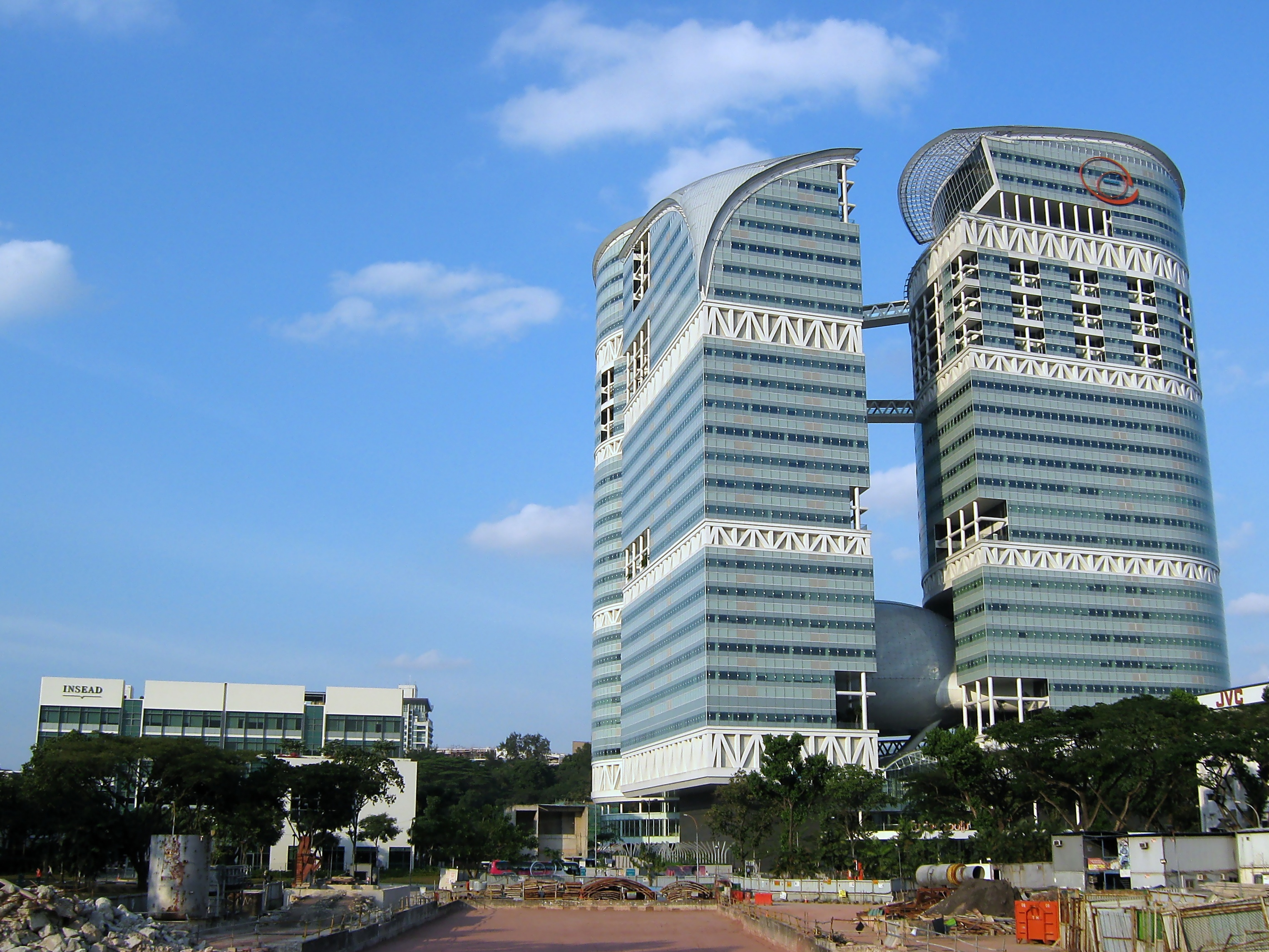
Fusionopolis Phase 1

- 1 October – Bus and train fares are adjusted by 0.7%.
- 10 October – The first issue of tabla! is launched, an English newspaper that caters to the Indian diaspora.
- 13 October – The Jewel Box's new extension in Mount Faber is officially opened.
- 17 October – Phase 1 of Fusionopolis (which have three office towers) is opened.
- 19 October – MediaCorp launches two free-to-air TV channels, okto and Vasantham, to replace Central.
- 30 October – Sing to the Dawn is released.
- 31 October – Marina Barrage is opened, making it Singapore's 15th reservoir. The Barrage will help to prevent flooding in the city centre, and serves as a place of recreation.

=== November ===
- 3 November – Keppel Corporation completes building two icebreakers for the Arctic, the first in Asia as well as the first time being done in the tropics.
- 7 November – Bombardier Transportation is awarded a contract for Downtown MRT line trains, part of six contracts awarded for the new line.
- 10 November – A second school for those who did not do well in PSLE, the Assumption Pathway School, will start taking in students from 2009.
- 21 November – Awards under the Athletes Achievement Awards scheme are doubled for Paralympians after increased funding announced by Tote Board, which will fund the full sum compared to previously. This comes after a debate on differences in rewarding able-bodied and disabled athletes.

=== December ===
- 1 December – Sembawang Shopping Centre is reopened to the public after the renovation in 2007.
- 23 December – Singapore Flyer stops for six hours due to technical problems.

=== Date unknown ===
- The 1st phase of the Deep Tunnel Sewerage System is completed.
- The Singapore Totalisator Board is renamed to Tote Board.
- The Common Services Tunnel is completed.

== Deaths ==
- 4 January – Jimmy Nah, comedian and actor (b. 1967).
- 7 January – Robert Chandran, businessman (b. 1950).
- 22 January – Mofradi bin Haji Mohamed Noor, prominent trade unionist, former Chairman of Masjid Al-Amin and founding member of the People's Action Party (b. 1918).
- 30 January – Tan Tock San, philanthropist and banker (b. 1925).
- 8 February
  - Chua Ek Kay, artist (b. 1947).
  - Ah Meng, the iconic Sumatran Orangutan of Singapore Zoo.
- 5 March – Anne Johnson, Council Member of Inter-Religious Organisation and Elder at Orchard Road Presbyterian Church (b. 1929).
- 28 March – Myint Thein, Burmese activist (b. 1947).
- 7 April – Sim Boon Woo, former PAP Member of Parliament for Changi Constituency (b. 1938).
- 12 May – Choo Hwee Lim, music pioneer (b. 1931).
- 20 May – Ali Sadikin, Indonesian politician (b. 1926).
- 28 June
  - Gregory Yong, 2nd Archbishop of Singapore (b. 1925).
  - Tan Lead Sane, murder victim of Wu Yun Yun (b. 1975).
- 14 July – Ong Chit Chung, historian and PAP Member of Parliament for the Bukit Batok Division of Jurong GRC (b. 1949).
- 28 July – Syahrir, Indonesian economist (b. 1945).
- 6 August – Tan Teow Yeow, former Judicial Commissioner of the Supreme Court of Singapore (b. 1945).
- 4 September – Abdul Samad Ismail, journalist and a founding member of the People's Action Party (b. 1924).
- 5 September – Constance Mary Turnbull, author of A History of Singapore (b. 1927).
- 6 September – Nicole Lai, singer (b. 1974).
- 18 September – Zhang Meng, Feng Jianyu, and Yang Jie, murder victims of the Yishun triple murders.
- 30 September – Joshua Benjamin Jeyaretnam, 7th Secretary-General of Workers' Party, former Member of Parliament for Anson Constituency and founder of Reform Party (b. 1926).
- 3 October – Teo Soo Chuan, Singaporean businessman and President of Ngee Ann Kongsi (b. 1918).
- 16 October – Choo Xue Ying, murder victim of Rosli bin Yassin (b. 1961).
- 14 November – Mansor Sukaimi, former PAP Member of Parliament for Kampong Kembangan Constituency (b. 1943).
- 28 November – Lo Hwei Yen, Singaporean journalist, was a casualty in the 2008 Mumbai attacks (b. 1980).
- 5 December – Ho See Beng, union leader and former PAP Member of Parliament for Bras Basah Constituency and Khe Bong Constituency (b. 1918).

=== Date unknown ===
- Ong Eng Guan, 1st elected Mayor of Singapore, former Minister for National Development and former PAP and United People's Party legislative assemblyman for Hong Lim Constituency (b. 1925).
