= Uncle Monty =

Uncle Monty may refer to:

- Montgomery Montgomery, better known as Uncle Monty in A Series of Unfortunate Events
- Montague H. Withnail, Uncle Monty in the 1987 film Withnail and I
- Myint Thein, known as Uncle Monty, a Burmese activist
