= Murder of Daniel De Rozario =

1987 fatal shooting of an army staff sergeant in Singapore

Daniel De Rozario
- Born: Daniel De Rozario; 1953; Singapore, Malaysia
- Died: 17 July 1987 (aged 34); Clementi, Singapore
- Cause of death: Murdered
- Occupation: Soldier
- Employer: Singapore Armed Forces
- Known for: Murder victim

On 17 July 1987, at a military camp in Ulu Pandan Road in Singapore, 34-year-old Staff Sergeant (SSGT) Daniel De Rozario was fatally shot by a 19-year-old National Serviceman named Chia Chee Yeen (谢志贤 Xiè Zhìxián), a Lance Corporal who was also an armoury storeman. Lance Corporal Chia's motive for the shooting was due to SSGT De Rozario punishing him to be confined in the army camp for six weeks due to a disciplinary offence. Lance Corporal Chia, who admitted to the crime, stated that he hated the victim and was also a fan of Hong Kong actor Chow Yun Fatt, and thus he emulated a film role of Chow to kill SSGT De Rozario. Lance Corporal Chia, who also raised a defence of diminished responsibility, was found guilty of murder and sentenced to death on 28 May 1990, three years after he shot SSGT De Rozario to death.

== Murder ==
On 17 July 1987, soldiers at a military camp in Ulu Pandan Road heard the sound of a gunshot inside the area. It was later discovered that an army sergeant had been shot to death inside his office by one of the recruits.

The dead soldier was identified as Staff Sergeant (SSGT) Daniel De Rozario, who was 34 years old at the time he was murdered. A forensic pathologist, Dr Wee Keng Poh, confirmed that SSGT De Rozario had been killed by a single shot to his head from the front, and the bullet penetrated his brain and skull, and it caused fatal damage to the victim's head and led to the death of SSGT De Rozario on the spot. The suspected shooter, who was a National Serviceman and armoury storeman, was pursued by some of the soldiers who witnessed him carrying a rifle and having fired it at SSGT De Rozario, and after some distance, the shooter tried to commit suicide in his hiding place, but survived. The soldiers managed to subdue him at the scene and handed him over to the police. The suspect was also armed with a rifle and two pistols, and 90 rounds of live ammunition were also found in his possession at the time he was arrested.

The shooter, 19-year-old Lance Corporal Chia Chee Yeen, was charged with murder a day after he was arrested. He was remanded for psychiatric evaluation in August 1987. Lance Corporal Chia's case was later transferred to the High Court for trial hearing on a later date in February 1988.

== Trial proceedings ==
=== Court hearing ===
On 9 January 1990, Lance Corporal Chia Chee Yeen stood trial at the High Court for one count of murdering SSGT De Rozario. Chia was represented by Peter Yap while the prosecution was led by Ang Sin Teck. The trial was presided by two judges - High Court judge Punch Coomaraswamy and Judicial Commissioner Chao Hick Tin.

The trial court heard that a few days before the shooting, Lance Corporal Chia and two of his platoon mates were assigned to clean the toilet, but were scolded by SSGT De Rozario for not cleaning the toilet properly, and Lance Corporal Chia was incensed by the scolding, which was aggravated by SSGT De Rozario telling one of his platoon mates to go do a new task, and thus Lance Corporal Chia attempted to instigate his remaining platoon mate to not continue cleaning the toilet, and even acted in defiance to not complete the task. As a result, SSGT De Rozario punished Lance Corporal Chia by forbidding him from leaving the camp for the next six weeks (including the weekends when the NS men get to go home). On the day of the shooting, Chia armed himself with a rifle and two handguns, and some ammunition, and he headed to SSGT De Rozario's office to confront him. Aside from this, the court was told that Lance Corporal Chia had been punished for a total of nine times for breaking the rules during the past 13 months before the murder.

During the confrontation, SSGT De Rozario refused to stave off Lance Corporal Chia's punishment for a lighter one and he allegedly insulted Lance Corporal Chia, and as a result, Lance Corporal Chia fired the rifle at SSGT De Rozario, resulting in SSGT De Rozario being shot once in the head and thus killed on the spot. After killing SSGT De Rozario, Lance Corporal Chia fled to another location in the camp and he attempted to commit suicide by shooting himself. Ultimately, Lance Corporal Chia survived the suicide attempt and only sustained minor injuries, and he was therefore arrested. Lance Corporal Chia also stated he was a huge fan of Chow Yun Fatt, a famous Hong Kong actor, and idolized Chow for his character in the Cantonese drama serial The Bund. He stated he was obsessed with the character and therefore imagined himself as the hero, and viewed SSGT De Rozario as a villain, and he hated SSGT De Rozario utterly to the core due to SSGT De Rozario having punished him a lot during his time in the NS. Lance Corporal Chia also reportedly broke down in several emotional outbursts as the court proceedings continued on. Several soldiers who knew Lance Corporal Chia also corroborated his claims of being a fan of Chow, since he amassed a huge collection of items, including photographs of Chow and the movie posters of Chow's films. The defence also attempted to have Lance Corporal Chia's confession ruled as inadmissible at one point during the trial.

Dr R Nagulendran, the defence's psychiatrist, testified that Lance Corporal Chia was suffering from diminished responsibility as a result of psychotic depression, which affected his mental responsibility at the time of the offence, which the defence relied on to seek the reduction of their client's charge to manslaughter. However, Dr Ang Ah Ling was called by the prosecution to rebut the defence's medical opinion, and Dr Ang said that Lance Corporal Chia did not suffer from diminished responsibility at the time of the murder, since Lance Corporal Chia was able to maintain a satisfactory performance during his time in NS and he never displayed any abnormal behaviour before, during and after the murder, and he was fully aware of his actions. Lance Corporal Chia was also described to be a well-mannered and introverted person by his platoon mates, and his mother also stated she never noticed anything out of the ordinary from her son's daily behaviour or personality. Several other medical experts were also called to prove that the defendant was mentally sound at the time of the shooting, and Dr Chan Khim Yew, a prison psychiatrist, testified that he found it hard to assess Lance Corporal Chia due to him generally being uncommunicative, so much so that the trial had to be paused at one point to order a new psychiatric test.

=== Verdict ===
On 28 May 1990, the two trial judges - Judicial Commissioner Chao Hick Tin and Justice Punch Coomaraswamy - issued their decision in court. In their joint verdict, Judicial Commissioner Chao and Justice Coomaraswamy found Lance Corporal Chia guilty of murder, and sentenced him to death according to the law. Judicial Commissioner Chao, who read out the 30-page verdict in court, stated that the trial court was satisfied that Lance Corporal Chia was not suffering from diminished responsibility at the time of the murder. They cited the psychiatric evidence by the prosecution, which diagnosed Lance Corporal Chia with no abnormality of the mind, and he was at most, an average soldier who performed his line of duty with a satisfactory performance, and it was a trivial issue for Lance Corporal Chia to be occasionally punished for rule-breaking during his NS duties in cases similar to the other military conscripts.

From this, Judicial Commissioner Chao said that it was clear through this instance that Lance Corporal Chia possessed "a streak of temper which will even cause him to defy authority if he thinks what he is being asked to do is unfair", and he was not deluding himself into believing he was Chow Yun Fatt. The judges stated Lance Corporal Chia may have imitated the actions portrayed by Chow in his movies, but Lance Corporal Chia still retained his consciousness and understanding of his actions at the time of the shooting, which was done out of intention to cause the death of SSGT De Rozario or at least a bodily injury sufficient to cause SSGT De Rozario's death.

On these grounds, 21-year-old Lance Corporal Chia Chee Yeen was ruled guilty as charged, and given the death penalty, which was the mandatory sentence for a conviction of murder in Lance Corporal Chia's case.

== Aftermath ==
Shortly after her son was sentenced to death, Lance Corporal Chia's 39-year-old mother Lau Lai Fu, who was saddened at the death sentence, stated that Lance Corporal Chia, who was her only child and son, idolized Chow Yun Fatt as a result of Chow's role in the Cantonese drama serial The Bund, and she never noticed anything abnormal about the interest of her son, who dropped out of primary school and went to work at a young age, and she regretted not paying more attention to her son, whom she noticed had become moody during the days leading up to the murder, and speculated he might have acted impulsively after keeping his feelings bottled for a long time. Lance Corporal Chia's 53-year-old father Chia Weng Fatt reportedly resigned from his taxi driver job three years before to work as a cobbler and key-maker as he was unable to cope with the reality of his son facing a murder charge and the difficulty of potentially losing his son to the gallows.

After Lance Corporal Chia was condemned to death row, Chow Yun Fatt, who heard about the murder, was shocked and saddened to realize that his film role had an indirect connection to a murder case in Singapore. During his phone interview with a Singaporean newspaper from Hong Kong, Chow expressed his regret and apologized for the incident, and he emphasized that people should discern reality from fiction and not imitate whatever they see in the movies.

On 11 September 1991, Lance Corporal Chia Chee Yeen's appeal against his conviction and sentence were dismissed by the Court of Appeal. The three judges - Chief Justice Yong Pung How, High Court judge Frederick Arthur Chua (F A Chua) and Judge of Appeal L P Thean (Thean Lip Ping) - found that Lance Corporal Chia's defence of diminished responsibility was unsustainable because objective evidence proven that he was still in full control of his faculties at the time of the shooting, and he had the intent to shoot at SSGT De Rozario and consequently cause his death. With his death sentence upheld, Lance Corporal Chia had since been hanged in Changi Prison.

In 2012, Singaporean crime show In Cold Blood featured the case in the sixth episode of the show's second season, with the identities of the killer and victim changed for dramatic purposes. It was mentioned that Chia was hanged in 1993 for shooting De Rozario to death.

== See also ==
- Murder of Hor Koon Seng, a similar case in 1974
- Capital punishment in Singapore
