= Killing of Riana Agustina =

2005 case of an abusive wife who was killed by her husband

Riana Agustina
- Born: 1979; Indonesia
- Died: 25 October 2005 (aged 26); Bukit Merah, Singapore
- Cause of death: Strangulation
- Known for: Killed by her domestically abused husband

On 25 October 2005, 37-year-old Lim Ah Seng (林亚成 Lín Yǎchéng), a provision shop deliveryman, strangled his 26-year-old Indonesian Chinese common-law wife Riana Agustina (Note: Her name was also spelt as Riana Augustina) to death in his flat in Bukit Merah, Singapore.

== Background ==
Lim Ah Seng and Riana Agustina met in Batam, Indonesia sometime in 1997, and married unofficially in 1998. They had two children together, a daughter in 1998 and a younger son. Sometime in 2003, Lim won a lot of money from playing the Toto lottery. The family moved to Johor Bahru and rented a bungalow, and Lim also bought Riana a Honda sports car. They eventually moved back to Singapore after a year so their elder daughter could start primary school in 2005. This was when they bought the Bukit Merah flat.

== Abuse and subsequent killing ==
Sometime in 2003, five years after their marriage, Riana decided to abort the couple's third child, which Lim was unhappy about. Their marriage began to break down, and around this time, Riana started to abuse Lim. Between 2003 and 2005, Lim was enduring frequent beatings and psychological abuse by his wife. On one occasion, Lim was beaten so badly that he became deaf in one ear. Their two children were also beaten by Riana. Since their return to Singapore, Lim and Riana had been estranged, and their two children were staying with Lim's mother. These incidents of abuse eventually led Lim to seek help from the Ministry of Community Development, Youth and Sports and in November 2004, an official request for help was lodged. Subsequently, Riana was brought to a shelter but she left sometime in June or July 2005.

Riana was known to be very assertive, and her two young children were afraid of her. In one incident in early 2005, Riana had come to Lim's mother's place and attempted to take her daughter away with her, despite her daughter's refusal. Lim and Riana had not met each other for several months up till the evening of 25 October 2005, the day of the murder.

According to Lim's testimony, on the evening of 25 October 2005, Riana had called him to inform him that she wanted to go to Lim's mother's house to see their daughter. However, Riana unexpectedly showed up at Lim's house an hour later, explaining to Lim that she came here because she did not have the keys to his mother's house. She informed Lim that she wanted to bring their elder daughter to Jakarta. When Lim protested, Riana raised her voice, and they quarrelled for some time. Later that evening, Riana asked Lim if they could have sexual intercourse and Lim agreed. Afterwards, Riana again raised the issue of bringing their daughter to Jakarta. Lim once more refused, following which Riana threatened to report Lim to the police for rape if he persisted in his objection. She also told him that as she had a record with the Institute of Mental Health, she could get away with killing him. She slapped Lim once, then proceeded to the kitchen to try and grab a knife but was stopped by Lim. Around this time, Riana sent a text message to an unknown 'male friend', believed to be her boyfriend, asking him to call the police as she was in trouble with her husband.

Lim testified that at about 9.00 pm, Riana slapped and strangled him. Lim retaliated by strangling Riana, who collapsed and became motionless. Lim called out to her and tried to wake her up, but to no avail. Lim subsequently called his mother, and shortly after, police officers and Singapore Civil Defence Force officers showed up at the flat. A four-hour-long standoff ensued when Lim slammed the front door shut, refusing to let the officers in. He went to the kitchen, came back to the living room with two knives, stabbed himself in the thighs and threatened to kill himself. Officers from the Police Crisis Negotiation Unit had to be called in. With the help of Lim's children, the police eventually persuaded Lim to open the door, where they found Riana dead in the bedroom, and Lim was arrested. Riana's cause of death was certified as asphyxia due to manual strangulation.

== Trial of Lim Ah Seng ==
=== Trial hearing ===
On 7 July 2006, Lim Ah Seng stood trial in the High Court for the murder of Riana Agustina. The prosecution consisted of Deputy Public Prosecutors (DPP) Edwin San and Ong Luan Tze, while Lim was represented by veteran lawyer Subhas Anandan and his nephew Sunil Sudheesan. The judge presiding over the case was Judicial Commissioner (JC) Sundaresh Menon.

The defence's psychiatrist, Dr Tommy Tan of the Institute of Mental Health, testified that Lim was suffering from post-traumatic stress disorder (PTSD), which caused him abnormality of mind during the time of the killing, which amounted to diminished responsibility. This condition manifested itself in, among other things, constant anxiety and fear of the deceased, depressed moods, suicidal thoughts and hypervigilance to the presence of the deceased. The charge was amended to one of culpable homicide not amounting to murder under section 304(b) of the Penal Code of which Lim pleaded guilty to.

=== Judgment ===
The prosecution pressed for a sentence of 4½ years' imprisonment, but in view of several mitigating factors in favour of Lim, JC Menon sentenced Lim to 2½ years' imprisonment from the date of his arrest. JC Menon noted that Lim was not an aggressive person by nature and had shown "uncommon meekness" in response to his wife's beatings. On the evening in question, Riana was the aggressor and Lim had exercised considerable restraint during the initial argument, right up to the point when Riana strangled him. There were also no aggravating factors to the case and no real likelihood of recurrence, points which DPP Edwin San accepted.

=== Appeal ===
The prosecution filed an appeal against the sentence, arguing that it was too short. The Court of Appeal's three judges, Judge of Appeal Andrew Phang and Justices V. K. Rajah and Tay Yong Kwang questioned Lim's version of events and in a rare move in Singapore judicial history allowed the appeal and ordered the case to be remitted back to the High Court for re-sentencing by the original trial judge JC Sundaresh Menon. Justice Rajah criticised both prosecution and defense counsels for not drawing the attention of the court to Riana's autopsy report, which showed she had suffered nineteen injuries on her arms, described by the pathologist as "grip marks and defensive injuries". In contrast, Lim's only injuries were stab marks self-inflicted after Riana's death. Justice Tay asked for further reports and evidence to be submitted to the High Court and Justice Rajah said explanation was needed to close the "substantial gap" between "the aggravated version of events and the evidence".

On 26 March 2007, the High Court, on reviewing the further reports and evidence submitted, rejected the arguments of the prosecution for a longer jail term. The original trial judge, JC Menon once again sentenced Lim to serve the original sentence of 2½ years' imprisonment with effect from the date of his arrest, explaining that the mitigating factors of the case were sufficient to warrant a lenient sentence. Lim was released since then.

== Aftermath ==
In 2012, crime show In Cold Blood featured the case in the eighth episode of the show's second season.

== See also ==
- Domestic violence
- List of major crimes in Singapore
