= 1998 Tampines flat murder =

1998 murder of fruit-seller in Singapore

Tan Eng Yan
- Tan Eng Yan, the fruit stall helper who was murdered.
- Born: Tan Eng Yan; 1948; Singapore
- Died: 26 August 1998 (aged 49–50); Tampines, Singapore
- Cause of death: Murdered
- Other names: Lily; Tan Ah Leng
- Occupation: Fruit stall helper
- Employer: An unnamed fruit stall owner at a wet market in Tampines
- Known for: Murder victim
- Spouse: Tan Cheng Guan
- Children: 1

On 26 August 1998, 50-year-old Tan Eng Yan (Chinese: 陈英燕; Pe̍h-ōe-jī: Tân Eng-iàn), a fruit stall assistant working at a market in Tampines, was found brutally murdered in the toilet of her Tampines flat. Tan, also known as Lily or Tan Ah Leng, was stabbed and slashed 58 times and four of the knife wounds were fatal. Her money, amounting to over S$2,200 in cash and S$6,000 in coins, was also stolen from her flat. It took five days before the police arrested a fishmonger named Lau Lee Peng (Chinese: 刘立平; Pe̍h-ōe-jī: Lâu Li̍p-pêng), who was a close friend of Tan, after he confessed during witness questioning that he killed Tan and led the police to where he hid the money.

Lau claimed that on the day of the murder, he went to Tan's flat to ask for information on the address of a woman who owed him money. However, he was gravely provoked into killing Tan after she failed to find the paper that had the address written on it. The prosecution's evidence rebutted this story, arguing Lau had coldly and ruthlessly murdered Tan with the motive of committing robbery in order to steal Tan's money to discharge his huge debts from gambling. On 12 November 1999, Lau was sentenced to death for murder and was hanged on 1 September 2000 after losing his appeal. The appeal case of Lau became one of the iconic legal cases where it touched on the context of the defence of "sudden and grave provocation" against murder in Singapore.

== Murder investigation ==
On 26 August 1998, 17-year-old Chen Hui Min returned from school and discovered a thin trail of blood leading to her Tampines flat. Upon entry, she discovered the bloodied corpse of her 50-year-old mother Tan Eng Yan (alias Tan Ah Leng or Lily) inside the toilet. The police were contacted and they arrived at the crime scene. Tan's husband, Tan Cheng Guan, searched the flat on the police's request and discovered that over S$2,200 in cash and S$6,000 in coins were missing from the flat.

Dr Wee Keng Poh, a senior forensic pathologist, conducted an autopsy and found that among 70 injuries on the body, there were a total of 58 stab and slash wounds inflicted upon Tan prior to her death. He identified a total of four fatal knife wounds, two on the neck and two on both Tan's hands, as the cause of her death. Both Tan's hands were nearly amputated and the left hand was hanging on by a strand of skin. There were also signs of Tan trying to ward off the blows from her killer. The trail of blood outside Tan's flat led the police to a carpark near another one of the blocks located opposite to Tan's residential block. The police thus suspected that the assailant was injured and may have known Tan, as there were no signs of forced entry into the flat. The police spent the next five days interviewing Tan's friends from a wet market at Tampines, where Tan worked as a fruit stall assistant.

On the fifth day of questioning, a 46-year-old fishmonger named Lau Lee Peng was questioned. Lau, who sustained injuries on his right hand and the right toe, eventually confessed that he killed Tan, and he also led the police to his truck, where some cash and seven plastic bags of coins belonging to Tan were found. This led to Lau being arrested for murder. Lau stated he had an accomplice, a Malaysian friend whom he called "Ah Meng", who helped him to kill Tan. The DNA tests at the crime scene found the DNA of a third person other than Tan and Lau, which confirmed Lau had an accomplice. However, in subsequent interrogations, Lau claimed there was no "Ah Meng" and insisted he was the sole person responsible for the murder. Lau was charged in court with murder on 2 September 1998.

== Trial of Lau Lee Peng ==
=== Prosecution's case ===
On 1 November 1999, Lau Lee Peng's trial to the murder charge relating to Tan Eng Yan's death began at the High Court. Veteran criminal lawyer Subhas Anandan represented Lau in his trial, while David Lee led the prosecution. Judicial commissioner Amarjeet Singh was the presiding judge of the case.

According to Tan's acquaintances and family members in court, Tan was known to be a friendly person who was sociable at her workplace, but she often boasted about the huge amount of money she saved up at her home, and often showed off large sums of cash in front of them. It was revealed that Lau, who was close friends with Tan, had been engaging in gambling and horse-betting very often, and he often borrowed money from his friends (including Tan), illegal moneylenders and loan sharks to feed his compulsive gambling habit, which led to him suffering from huge debts amounting to over thousands of dollars. Lau was also known to be aware of Tan's great wealth and huge savings in home.

It was revealed that prior to the murder, Lau was part of a tontine group led by Phai Sai Poh (alias Ah Poh) between August 1996 and January 1998, and during that period, Lau had to give his monthly share of S$500 to form a tontine bid for a monetary loan with immediate interest every month, and in total, Lau paid over S$10,000. However, Lau failed to win a loan from the monthly tontine activities. In May 1998, the tontine group was dissolved, as Ah Poh went into hiding as a result of her gambling debts and among the cash she took, Ah Poh owed Lau S$10,000, which Lau desperately needed to discharge his gambling debts.

According to Lau's police statements (which formed the prosecution's case), he heard from Tan on 21 August 1998 that she has Ah Poh's new address, but he forgot about it due to his urgency to attend a scheduled horse betting session. He only remembered it four days later and asked Tan to give him the address. It was only the next day, the same day Tan was murdered, that Tan told Lau she could not find the address, and she offered for Lau to go to her flat. After arriving at Tan's flat, Tan failed to find the address despite searching for it extensively, which made Lau deeply enraged and he took a chopper to slash and stab Tan in the midst of an intense quarrel, leading to Tan's death. However, when Ah Poh showed up in court, she stated she did not tell Tan about her new address, meaning that Tan could not have known about Ah Poh's new address like what Lau claimed. Also, Ah Poh stated she never saw Lau chasing her for his money as desperately as he himself said.

=== Lau's defense ===
Lau elected to go on the stand to give his defence on 9 November 1999. He put up a defence of sudden and grave provocation, and a defence of sudden fight. The narration of the pre-events leading up to the murder was similar to his police statements, but regarding the event in the flat, Lau stated that before he attacked Tan in a moment of anger, Tan had berated him for losing his money and cursed at him, stating that he, as a man, should be ashamed of losing money to a woman. Tan even verbally humiliated Lau's mother, which made Lau flare up even more in combination to his simmering rage that Tan failed to locate Ah Poh's address. Tan even mocked Lau and threatened him that she would fight him and take the chopper near her kitchen sink to kill him, which made Lau smash a vase on her head. Seeing that Tan collapsed, Lau took the chance to take the chopper before Tan could reach it, and he began to slash and stab at Tan repeatedly, before he disposed of her lifeless corpse in the toilet. After Tan died, Lau stated he searched the address himself but only found the money in Tan's home and thus took all of it.

Although Lau insisted he did the killing due to the fear he had for his life and the provocation of Tan's verbal abuse and failure to find Ah Poh's address, and claimed he himself was shocked at the photographs of the injuries he caused on Tan as a result of anger, the prosecution rebutted that Lau clearly knew what he was doing, and highlighted the inconsistencies between his statements and testimony, pointing out that Lau never mentioned Tan verbally abusing him and threatening to kill him during the police interrogations. They argued that Lau's case could hardly be said as an acceptable case of killing caused by sudden and grave provocation or sudden fight due to the harm being completely disproportionate to the provocation and/or harm suffered by Lau. They also said Lau intentionally inflicted fatal knife injuries on Tan and had a clear motive of committing robbery at her flat in order to steal her huge wealth for the sake of paying off his debts from his compulsive gambling addiction (and there was evidence which showed Lau using some of Tan's money to pay off some of his debts). They urged the court to reject Lau's defences and find him guilty as charged.

=== Verdict ===
Lau Lee Peng, the fishmonger who was found guilty of murder and sentenced to death.

On 12 November 1999, Judicial commissioner Amarjeet Singh found 47-year-old Lau Lee Peng guilty of murder and sentenced him to death.

Singh stated in his verdict that he did not accept Lau's two defences of a sudden fight and sudden and grave provocation. He found that the alleged verbal abuse Tan inflicted upon Lau, in addition to Tan's failure to locate Ah Poh's written new address, could hardly be considered as actions that would gravely provoke a reasonable person in Lau's position, and it also definitely did not warrant a justification for Lau to fly into such an intense rage and slash her to death. Besides, the harm that Lau inflicted upon Tan was extremely severe and cruel, which was totally disproportionate to the degree of provocation given. Also, if compared to Lau's two injuries on his hand and foot, the huge degree of injury found on Tan showed there was no fight that was so intense that it would require Lau to fear for his life. By arming himself with a chopper before the supposed fight, Lau would have dissipated his fear of Tan and the use of the chopper had gone beyond the necessary harm required in the fight. Based on witnesses' accounts, Lau was said to have no irrational behaviour and was calm throughout the post-killing days, meaning he could not have lost his head as he claimed.

Since Lau failed his two defences against the murder charge, and his motive of the murder was identified as robbery, Lau was convicted of murdering Tan and sentenced to death. Jason Tan (unrelated to the victim), a reporter for The New Paper, wrote in an article that Lau was motionless at the time of sentencing, but he could detect the cold-bloodedness and wickedness from the former fishmonger's eyes and expressed his shock at the photos of the bloodstained toilet where Tan's body was discovered. Tan's daughter Chen Hui Min reportedly wept at the verdict of her mother's murder. Tan's former employer stated he was not surprised at all towards the guilty verdict of death in his former stall helper's case.

== Appeal and execution ==
On 25 January 2000, the Court of Appeal rejected Lau Lee Peng's appeal against his sentence, and gave their judgement on 11 March 2000. Like the original trial judge, the three judges - Chao Hick Tin, Lai Kew Chai and L. P. Thean (Thean Lip Ping) - who heard the appeal agreed that Lau's defence of grave and sudden provocation should not be accepted due to the brutality of the killing being overly disproportionate to the supposed provocation given by Tan Eng Yan before her murder. The fact that Lau had the consciousness to pick up nearby objects to defend himself and aimed at the vital parts of Tan's body during the knife attack showed that Lau was not provoked, but had a clear intention to cause Tan's death and was in full control of his mental faculties. They also rejected Lau's cited low intellect since Lau was able to concoct a fictional accomplice named "Ah Meng" to deflect blame from himself at first before his subsequent confession, and it did not support how he neglected to mention about Tan's threat to kill him in the police interrogations.

On 15 September 2000, six months after his appeal was dismissed, 48-year-old Lau Lee Peng was executed by hanging at Changi Prison, and two more prisoners (including convicted murderer Chan Chim Yee) were hanged at the same time and date as Lau. However, other sources (including police sources) recorded Lau's execution date as 1 September 2000. It was reported that even up till his execution, Lau remained insistent that he did not intentionally murder Tan and refused to show remorse over his crime.

== Aftermath ==
In the aftermath of the case and execution, the annual season of Singaporean crime show Crimewatch featured the murder of Tan Eng Yan as its tenth and final episode in the same year of Lau Lee Peng's execution, and the episode first aired on 28 December 2000.

Another Singaporean crime show named True Files also re-adapted and featured the case. It first aired as the 12th episode of the show's first season on 18 July 2002, and Lau's former lawyer Subhas Anandan was featured in an on-screen interview relating to his client's case. In the episode itself, Anandan revealed that he actually suspected that there was an accomplice as Lau initially claimed in his first statements, but Lau denied it when the lawyer inquired him about it. He stated that even if Lau indeed was not alone when killing Tan, it would not affect the trial verdict of death because the prosecution would argue that there was a common intention between both accused to commit the offence of murder.

In 2012, another crime show In Cold Blood featured the case in the eleventh episode of the show's second season.

The appeal verdict in Lau's case, titled Lau Lee Peng v Public Prosecutor, was listed as one of the notable legal cases which touched on the concept of the defence of "sudden and grave provocation" against murder in Singapore. The case of Lau's defence of grave and sudden provocation was notably referenced to in several murder cases, including the case of Sundarti Supriyanto, an Indonesian maid who was charged with murdering her employer Angie Ng and Ng's daughter Crystal Poh. In Sundarti's case, the judge accepted that, in contrast to Lau's case, Sundarti was indeed losing her self-control and gravely provoked into murdering Ng (as well as Poh) as a result of the prolonged maid abuse and starvation during the months she spent working under Ng, which allowed Sundarti to be sentenced to life imprisonment for culpable homicide not amounting to murder.

== See also ==
- Capital punishment in Singapore
- List of major crimes in Singapore
