= Preventive detention =

Detention for non-punitive reasons

Preventive detention is imprisonment that is used for non-punitive purposes, most often to prevent further criminal acts.

Preventive detention sometimes involves the detention of a convicted criminal who has served their sentence but is considered too dangerous to release.

Remand or pre-trial detention and involuntary commitment are sometimes considered a form of preventive detention.

== Specific jurisdictions ==
=== Australia ===
Australian laws authorize preventive detention in a variety of circumstances.

In New South Wales, preventive detention regimes, such as Serious Crime Prevention Orders (SCPOs), allow the state to detain, continuously monitor, and limit particular activities of those convicted of serious sexual and violent offences. A range of state officials may apply to the NSW courts to create an SCPO consisting of conditions deemed appropriate, such as an obligation to report to a police station and prohibitions on travelling beyond a certain region. Failure to comply with an SCPO carries a maximum penalty of five years' imprisonment.

SCPOs have been described as a "watershed extension of state power in New South Wales" by legal academics, and were strongly opposed by the legal community when they were introduced.

=== Costa Rica ===
In Costa Rica, the 1998 Criminal Proceedings Code allows for a pre-trial remand of 12 months if the person is considered a "flight risk". If the case is considered complex in nature, the detention can be increased to up to three and a half years. As of 23 May 2013, over 3,000 people were in pre-trial detention.

=== Denmark ===
In cases connected to riots or other situations involving public safety risks, the police can detain a person for up to twelve hours without involving the courts. Until 2009, the limit was six hours. This change was part of the so-called Lømmelpakke (da).

=== Germany ===
In Germany, preventive detention (German: Sicherungsverwahrung) is an indeterminate sentence that follows regular imprisonment, imposed as part of a criminal sentence.

Sicherungsverwahrung is imposed in the original judicial sentence. It could formerly be subsequently imposed under certain circumstances, but the practice of subsequent incapacitation was ruled a violation of Art 7 of the European Convention on Human Rights by the European Court of Human Rights. The Federal Constitutional Court of Germany also issued a verdict on Sicherungsverwahrung in May 2011, deeming it unconstitutional. In response, a new law regulating Sicherungsverwahrung was passed in November 2012.

In 2023, 27 supporters of the Last Generation climate movement were preemptively imprisoned after the group announced protests of the International Motor Show Germany.

=== India ===
In India, preventive detention can be used for a maximum of three months, a limit which can be changed by Parliament. According to the Preventive Detention Act 1950, it can be extended up to a total of twelve months on the favourable recommendation of an advisory board made up of High Court judges or persons eligible to be appointed High Court judges.

Preventive detention in India dates from British rule in the early 1800s, and continued with such laws as the Defence of India Act, 1939 and the Preventive Detention Act 1950.

The Maintenance of Internal Security Act was originally enacted by the Indian parliament early during Indira Gandhi's prime ministership in 1971. It was amended several times during "The Emergency" (1975–1977), leading to human rights violations. It was subsequently repealed after Indira Gandhi lost the election in 1977.

India's National Security Act of 1980 empowers the Central Government and State Governments to detain a person to prevent them from acting in any manner prejudicial to the security of India, the relations of India with foreign countries, the maintenance of public order, or the maintenance of supplies and services essential to the community. The act also gives power to the governments to detain a foreigner in order to regulate their presence or expel them from the country. The act was passed in 1980 during the Indira Gandhi government. The maximum period of detention is 12 months. The order can also be made by the District Magistrate or a Commissioner of Police under their respective jurisdictions, but the detention must be reported to the State Government along with the grounds on which the order was made. The National Security Act along with other laws allowing preventive detention have come under wide criticism for their alleged misuse.

=== Japan ===
In Japan, pre-trial detention of a suspect can be for up to 23 days without charge. The length of detention is at the discretion of the public prosecutor and subject to the approval of local courts. It can also be extended.

=== Malaysia ===
In Malaysia the Internal Security Act 1960 (ISA) was a preventive detention law that was enacted after Malaysia gained independence from Britain in 1957. The ISA allowed for detention without trial or criminal charges under limited circumstances. The ISA was invoked against terrorism activity and against anyone deemed a threat to national security. On 15 September 2011, Najib Razak, the then Prime Minister of Malaysia, said that the legislation would be repealed and replaced by two new laws.

On 17 April 2012, the Security Offences (Special Measures) Act 2012 (SOSMA) was approved by the Malaysian Parliament as a replacement for the ISA. It was given the royal assent on 18 June 2012 and gazetted on 22 June 2012.

=== New Zealand ===
New Zealand has two types of preventive detention. The one called "preventive detention" is an indeterminate sentence of imprisonment. The other is called a "public protection order" and is a civil detention.

"Preventive detention" is an indeterminate sentence of imprisonment, similar to life imprisonment and second only to it in terms of seriousness. It may be given to offenders aged 18 or over who are convicted of a qualifying sexual or violent offence, and the court is satisfied that the person is likely to commit another qualifying sexual or violent offence if they were given a fixed term of imprisonment. Preventive detention has a minimum non-parole period of five years in prison. Sentencing judges may impose a longer non-parole period, when they believe that the prisoner's history warrants it. Parole conditions last for the rest of the offender's life and they can be recalled to prison at any time. A total of 314 people were serving terms of preventive detention in 2013, of whom 34 were on parole.

A public protection order is a civil detention order for someone who has finished a finite prison sentence and still poses a very high risk of serious sexual or violent reoffending. The person is detained in a secure civil residence inside the perimeter of a prison.

=== Singapore ===
In Singapore, preventive detention is a special type of imprisonment reserved for recalcitrant offenders at least 30 years old with at least three previous convictions since turning 16. This detention order, which may last between seven and twenty years, does not allow remissions for good behaviour. It is usually used to detain offenders are deemed a threat to society, with the purpose of isolating them for the protection of society.

For example, in 2004, Chong Keng Chye was sentenced to 20 years of preventive detention for abusing a child to death and for various cheating offences. He had several past convictions for cheating and violent crimes since he was 16. In another case, Rosli Yassin was sentenced in 2012 to 12 years preventive detention for culpable homicide and cheating, before the detention order was increased to 20 years upon the prosecution's appeal. Drug trafficker Abdul Kahar Othman served ten years of preventive detention from 1995 to 2005 due to a lengthy criminal record of drug offences.

In February 2024, Singapore passed a dangerous offenders law where dangerous offenders can be held indefinitely even after they have completed their sentences for certain offences such as rape, culpable homicide and abuse of minors. The law will apply to those from the age of 21 and above and those subject to it will be assessed on an annual basis.

=== South Africa ===
Under Apartheid, the government of South Africa used preventive detention laws to target its political opponents. These included, notably, the Terrorism Act of 1967, which gave police commanders the power to detain terrorists—or people with information about terrorists—without a warrant.

=== United States ===
Section 1021 and 1022 of the legislation enacted policies described by The Guardian as allowing indefinite detention "without trial [of] American terrorism suspects arrested on U.S. soil who could then be shipped to Guantánamo Bay".

Many U.S. states have sexually violent predator laws which permit indefinite detention of certain classes of offenders.

== See also ==
- Administrative detention
- Anti-Terrorism Act 2005 (Australia)
- Arbitrary arrest and detention
- Civil confinement
- Criminal Law (Temporary Provisions) Act (Singapore)
- Indefinite imprisonment
- Internal Security Act (Singapore)
- Pre-crime
- Preemptive arrest
