= In Cold Blood (Singaporean TV series) =

Singaporean real-life crime show (2011–2013)

- In Cold Blood
- Genre: Crime
- Starring: Keagan Kang
- Country of origin: Singapore
- Original language: English
- No. of seasons: 3
- No. of episodes: 36

Production
- Running time: approx. 20 minutes

Original release
- Network: Mediacorp
- Release: 2011 – 2013

In Cold Blood is an English-language television docu-drama telecast on MediaCorp Channel 5, with each episode re-enacting a major violent crime in Singapore. The series first premiered on Channel 5 in 2011. A total of three seasons were run in the years 2011, 2012 and 2013.

The show was hosted by actor Keagan Kang in all three seasons.

Currently, the show is viewable on meWATCH (previously named Toggle).

== Episodes ==
=== Season 1 (2011) ===
1. Fatal Attraction
2. Morbid Jealousy
3. Gambling Addiction
4. Maid Abuse
5. The Tenant
6. Love Hurts
7. Parental Abuse
8. Child Abuse
9. Depression
10. Frontal Lobe Syndrome
11. Teen Terrors
12. Murder She Wrote

=== Season 2 (2012) ===
1. The Curse
2. Scar Boy
3. Problems-In-Law
4. Red String Death
5. Maid in a Box
6. The Hero That Wasn't
7. Act of Desperation
8. Post Traumatic Stress Syndrome
9. Robbery Gone Wrong
10. Deadly Panic
11. Gross Overreaction
12. Graves' Disease

=== Season 3 (2013) ===
1. I Killed My Mother
2. God of Hell
3. Mummy
4. The Eyes Have It
5. Baby Killer
6. Cabby Killer
7. Stomped
8. Death By Poison
9. Murder For Gold
10. Kleptomania
11. Menace of Society
12. Lethal Silence
