= 1998 Bukit Merah stabbing =

1998 case of a woman murdered by stabbing in Bukit Merah

Ooi Ang Yen
- Ooi Ang Yen, the 43-year-old murder victim
- Born: c. 1955; Colony of Singapore
- Died: 11 August 1998 (aged 43); Queenstown, Singapore
- Cause of death: Knife wounds to the heart
- Occupation: Factory production worker
- Employer: Image Printers Pte Ltd
- Known for: Murder victim
- Spouse: Lim Ah Lek (former)
- Children: 4

On 11 August 1998, 43-year-old Ooi Ang Yen (Chinese: 黄红燕; Pe̍h-ōe-jī: Ûiⁿ Âng-iàn), a divorced mother of four and a factory production worker, was stabbed to death by her ex-boyfriend at a carpark nearby her workplace in Bukit Merah, Singapore. Her 41-year-old boyfriend and married father of two, Chan Chim Yee (Chinese: 陈振义; Jyutping: Can4 Zan3 Ji6; Pe̍h-ōe-jī: Tân Chín-gī), was arrested 12 days later and charged with murder. According to court documents and media, Ooi wanted to leave Chan in favor of another man, and therefore, Chan went to the victim's workplace and attacked her with a knife. Although Chan raised two defences of an alibi and diminished responsibility, the trial court rejected his defences and therefore, Chan was found guilty of murdering Ooi and sentenced to death. Chan's appeal was dismissed and he was hanged on 15 September 2000.

== Stabbing and death ==
On the evening of 11 August 1998, at a carpark outside her workplace in Bukit Merah, a female factory worker was attacked by a knife-wielding man, who stabbed her several times on the arm, throat and chest before he fled the scene. The victim, identified as 43-year-old Ooi Ang Yen, was tended at the scene by her colleagues, and she was later pronounced dead 20 minutes after arriving at Alexandra Hospital. A 24-year-old male passer-by, who witnessed the perpetrator running past him with a knife in his hand, called the police.

According to the forensic pathologist, Dr Paul Chui, who conducted an autopsy on the victim, he found at least two stab wounds on the chest of Ooi. These penetrated the heart, and the severity of the wounds were such that they were sufficient in the ordinary course of nature to cause death. Ooi was described as a good co-worker and a kind and compassionate person, and at one instance, Ooi even took care of an 80-year-old female stranger and let her stay in her home.

The fatal stabbing was witnessed by Ooi's colleagues, who all recognized the attacker as Ooi's former boyfriend, who was seen arriving an hour earlier at the workplace and approached Ooi while she was going home from work with them, and reportedly quarreled with Ooi over her new boyfriend before he allegedly stabbed her. First-hand information revealed that prior to the stabbing, Ooi was formerly married with four children when she first met her ex-boyfriend, a former seaman with whom she had a relationship after they travelled to China together, and this affair was what resulted in the couple's divorce a year before the murder. Subsequently, just a couple of months ago, Ooi began a new relationship with a 40-year-old male colleague and as a result, her relationship with the ex-boyfriend deteriorated and it became fraught with constant quarrels; Ooi also requested to break up with the ex-boyfriend. It was also revealed that the male colleague had been confronted and assaulted by the ex-boyfriend, and the colleague was forced to resign to avoid having another encounter with the ex-boyfriend and for fear of his safety.

== Arrest and charges ==
The police, having interviewed the witnesses of the stabbing, classified the case as murder and therefore considered Ooi's former boyfriend as the prime suspect, and conducted a nationwide manhunt for the suspect, who remained at large and went into hiding as of the time the police identified him. The suspect's wife and their two children stated the suspect was not at home when the police went to his registered address.

12 days after the brutal killing, on 23 August 1998, following an informant's tip-off, the police managed to arrest Ooi Ang Yen's ex-boyfriend, who was spotted having a meal at a coffee shop in Toa Payoh. Subsequently, the next day, the 41-year-old suspect, Chan Chim Yee (alias Jimmy Chan), was charged with murder at a district court for stabbing his ex-girlfriend to death. Chan, who used to be a seaman, was working as a cleaner at the time he murdered Ooi.

The police were lauded for managing to solve the Ooi Ang Yen murder case and another murder case at Little India within a week. Altogether, eight murders happened within a month from July to August 1998, and five of them (including the 1998 Tampines flat murder) were solved by the police within a short period of time.

== Trial of Chan Chim Yee ==
=== Prosecution's case ===
On 25 October 1999, 41-year-old Chan Chim Yee officially stood trial at the High Court for one count of murdering Ooi Ang Yen in August 1998. Francis Xavier and Quek Bee Choo represented Chan during his trial, and Winston Cheng prosecuted Chan during the trial, which was presided over by Justice Kan Ting Chiu of the High Court.

During the trial, the court was told that Ooi first met Chan in 1995, when she went on a trip to China, and they became romantically involved despite their respective marriages, and they maintained their relationship even after they returned to Singapore; this affair ultimately led to Ooi's divorce in 1997. Eventually, in 1998, Ooi met a colleague, Wong Hon Yee, and gradually, she began a relationship with Wong, and she had the intention to end her relationship with Chan, much to Chan's refusal. Chan would confront the couple on two occasions regarding their relationship, first in June 1998, when he went to Ooi's workplace during lunch time and asked her why she wanted to end things with him, and a second occasion in July 1998, when Chan confronted the couple while they were on the way for dinner, and Chan assaulted Wong during that confrontation. Ultimately, this became the motive behind Chan's decision to commit the murder of his ex-girlfriend on 11 August 1998, after he went there to confront and stab Ooi to death.

Ooi's two colleagues, Tay Ah Nai and Cheah Choy Keng, who both witnessed the murder, appeared in court as prosecution witnesses, and they both stated they recognised Chan as the perpetrator of the stabbing because they had seen him previously, when he came to Ooi's workplace to confront her about her relationship with Wong. Wong himself also came to court to testify, and confirmed he dated Ooi during the final months prior to the murder. Chan's supervisor Chua Cheng Kang and another co-worker, Adeline Tay Chay Kin, from his workplace, were also summoned to testify for the prosecution. They both told the court that on the date of the crime, Chan worked from 8 am to 5 pm, and clocked out of work after paging Adeline Tay, and he never reported for work after the killing. Adeline Tay said that she never came personally to the workplace to inform Chan to work overtime from 5 pm to 9 pm, unlike what the defence put forward while presenting Chan's alibi defence. Chan's 20-year-old son, Chan Yew Leong, the elder of Chan's two children (the second child was an 18-year-old daughter), testified that his father reached home at past 10 pm on the night of the murder, but he was absent from home from midnight onwards.

=== Chan's defences ===
When he was called to make his defence, Chan, who denied the murder charge, presented a two-tier defence to rebut the murder charge. The first tier of his defence was one of an alibi; Chan claimed that he was at work when the stabbing incident took place. He stated that at the time of the murder, he worked from 8 am to 5 pm, and even worked overtime from 5 pm to 9 pm. Chan's counsel called upon two security guards - Mahmood Osman and Vincent Wong Chun Keong - to testify on his behalf. Mahmood verified he saw Chan going to work as per usual from 8 am to 5 pm, but he was unable to confirm if he did see the defendant from 7 pm to 8 pm, while Vincent Wong said he cannot remember if he had seen Chan on that day itself. Chan himself claimed he only found out about Ooi's death through a newspaper a day after the stabbing.

Chan's second tier of defence was diminished responsibility, which was a last resort made by Chan should his alibi defence was rejected and the judge found he was the one who killed Ooi. Chan's lawyers engaged Dr Douglas Kong, a consultant psychiatrist, to testify on Chan's behalf, and based on his psychiatric report, Dr Kong testified that Chan was suffering from paranoid personality disorder and also had borderline intelligence. Dr Kong said the Chan's low IQ made him less likely to be capable of coping with stress and control his temper, and the disorder itself was what caused Chan to be in a "dissociative fugue" state and a paranoid psychosis at the time of the stabbing. Dr Kong also explained that this was influenced by Chan's deteriorating relationship with Ooi and his emotions over this issue, and Chan's memory of the killing was distorted due to the emotional impact of Ooi's death on Chan.

In rebuttal, the prosecution's psychiatric expert, Dr Gwee Kok Peng, an associate consultant psychiatrist at Woodbridge Hospital, testified that Chan was mentally normal at the time of the murder, and he was not in a dissociative fugue state as Dr Kong diagnosed him to be. Dr Gwee also said that normally for a person in a dissociative fugue state, he or she would usually escape from a stressful situation and therefore tend to wander away from the place associated with the stressful situation, which was inconsistent with Chan's decision to confront Ooi and subsequently stab Ooi to death. Chan's testimony was reportedly described as a "pack of lies" due to him denying his involvement in the murder.

=== Verdict ===
On 5 November 1999, Justice Kan Ting Chiu delivered his verdict.

In the verdict, Justice Kan found that Chan's first defence of an alibi was untenable, because he had been identified by the witnesses (mainly Ooi's colleagues) as the person stabbing Ooi to death, and the witnesses did not err in identifying Chan in spite of the defence's attempt to impeach their testimonies. Justice Kan also touched on the second defence of diminished responsibility, declaring that Chan had not proven that he suffered from an abnormality of the mind at the time of the murder, and Dr Kong's psychiatric report did not satisfactorily support his defence, given that Dr Gwee's diagnosis was more credible to provide a full assessment of Chan's state of mind at the time of the murder. Therefore, Justice Kan rejected both defences, and having found that Chan had intentionally stabbed 43-year-old Ooi Ang Yen, such that the injuries were sufficient in the ordinary course of nature to cause death, Justice Kan concluded that there were sufficient grounds to return with a guilty verdict of murder in Chan's case.

As such, 42-year-old Chan Chim Yee was found guilty of murder, and sentenced to death by hanging. Under Singaporean law, the death penalty was mandated as the sole punishment for murder upon an offender's conviction for such an offence. Chan was reportedly emotionless when the death sentence was pronounced in court.

Ooi's ex-husband, Lim Ah Lek, with whom she had four children, was interviewed by a newspaper after the trial. He stated that the death of his ex-wife was unnecessary, and he agreed that Chan deserved the death sentence for murdering her, whom Lim used to share a happy life with prior to her affair and their divorce in 1997. Lim also told the press that he and his family had long forgiven his ex-wife in spite of the affair she had with Chan.

== Chan's appeal ==
On 24 January 2000, Chan Chim Yee's appeal was heard before the Court of Appeal.

On that day, after hearing arguments from the prosecutor Winston Cheng and the defence counsel of Chan, the Court of Appeal's three judges - Chao Hick Tin, Lai Kew Chai and L. P. Thean (Thean Lip Ping) - decided to reject Chan's appeal, because they found no error in the trial decision that deemed Chan guilty of murder. Like the original trial judge, the three judges stated that the alibi defence ought to be rejected due to the witnesses having correctly identified Chan as the killer, and the diminished responsibility defence based on Dr Kong's evidence was unsustainable in light of Dr Gwee's findings, which the judge correctly determined in his judgement.

With the loss of his appeal, Chan remained on death row at Changi Prison, where he would be executed within a few months.

In February 2000, the case of Ooi's murder was one of the ten most high-profile acts of violence against women in Singapore that happened during the past few years.

== Execution ==
On 15 September 2000, eight months after losing his appeal, 43-year-old Chan Chim Yee was hanged in Changi Prison at dawn for murdering Ooi Ang Yen back in 1998. On that same date, two other death row prisoners were reportedly put to death at the same prison; one of them was former fishmonger Lau Lee Peng, who was charged in 1998 with the violent killing of a fruit stall helper in the victim's Tampines flat. Lau was found guilty of using a chopper to hack the 50-year-old woman, Tan Eng Yan, to death and sentenced to hang in November 1999 (the same month when Chan received the death penalty), and Lau's appeal was dismissed in January 2000, eight months before his execution.

== See also ==
- Capital punishment in Singapore
