= Orchard Road Presbyterian Church =

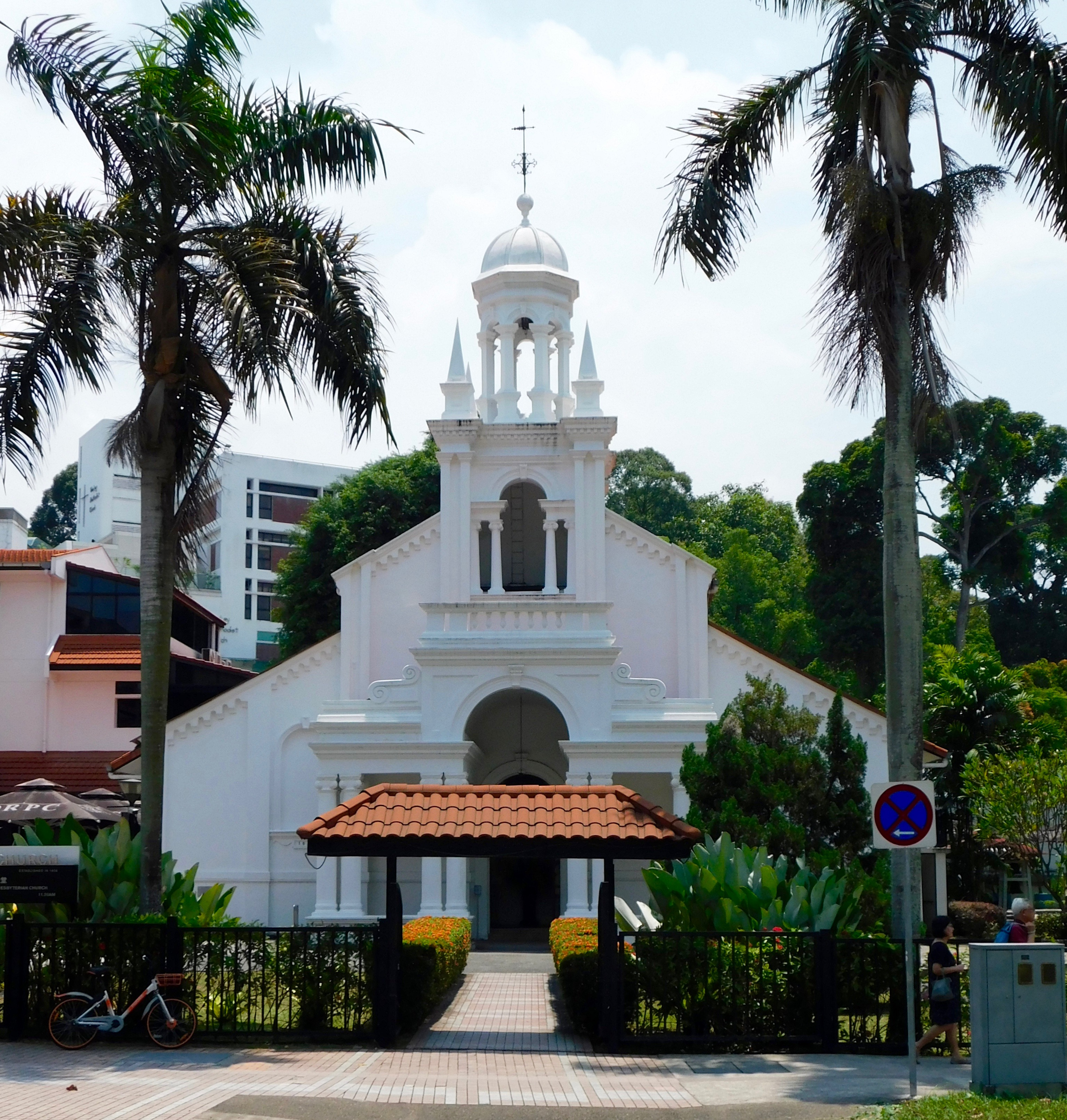

- Location within Singapore
- 1°17′52.9″N 103°50′50.9″E
- Location: 3 Orchard Road, Singapore 238825
- Country: Singapore
- Denomination: Presbyterian

Architecture
- Functional status: Active
- Style: Palladian

The Orchard Road Presbyterian Church (ORPC; Chinese: 烏節路長老會教堂), also known as Greja Kechil ("small church" in Malay) and the Scotch Church, is a Presbyterian church in Singapore. The church was completed in 1878, and it is the oldest Presbyterian church in Singapore. The church was founded to serve the Scottish community in Singapore but now caters to a congregation of widely different backgrounds and holds services in a number of different languages.

== History ==
The church originated from the congregation of the Mission Chapel of Singapore which included members of the Scottish community of early Singapore. In 1822, its Scottish members held a meeting with the aim of setting up a local Presbyterian church; however, the first service was not held until 6 October 1856 with the arrival of Rev Thomas McKenzie Fraser to Singapore. The earliest service was held at the London Missionary Society's chapel on Bras Basah Road, later services were also held at the St Andrew's Church. In 1875, a piece of land on Orchard Road was allocated by the Governor of Singapore for the construction of the church, and the foundation stone for the church was laid by Colonel Anson on 1 August 1877. The building was completed in 1878 at a cost of $20,000.

The building has been extended over the years. In 1921, the Tomlinson Hall was added as a side-extension, but this was later demolished in 2002. A Sunday School was added in 1953, and other parts of the church extended – the church hall in 1954, and the sanctuary in 1975. The Dunman Hall was added in 1985.

A branch of the church was established in Bukit Batok that became independent in 2013, and an independent church was also established in 2005 for its Chinese congregation, the Providence Presbyterian Church.

== Architecture ==
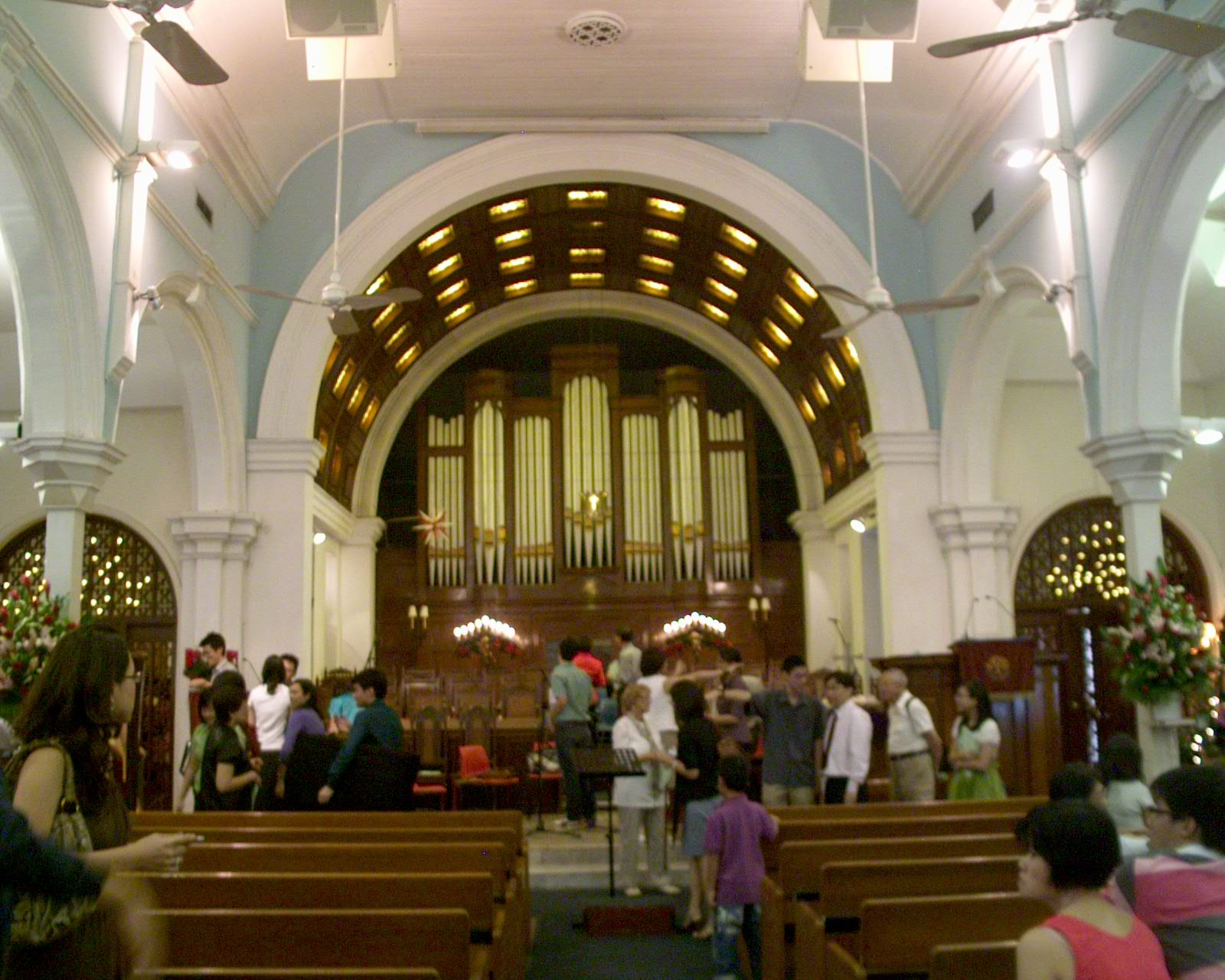
Interior of the church

The building is single storey structure with tiled pitched roofs, with a Palladian-styled facade facing Orchard Road. The dominant feature of the facade is the Serlian motif (also called a Palladian window) – a central arched opening flanked by openings on either side with flat entablatures. The motif forms the porch which is supported by double Ionic columns, and a smaller version with single columns is repeated above the porch. The front facade has finials at the four corners of the tower, and it is topped by a cupola supported by columns.

== Pipe organ ==
The church has one of the few working pipe organs in Singapore. The first organ was installed in 1861, and the current one is the third to be constructed in the church. This organ was built in 1962 by J. W. Walker & Sons based on the 1926 two-manual and pedal-tracker organ by William Hill & Sons/Norman and Beard. Its action was electrified in 1987.

== Services ==
The church originally catered to the Scottish community in Singapore and services were conducted in English. Later services in other languages were also offered to members of different communities, with the first Mandarin Chinese service given on Easter Sunday 1968. Currently the church also offers services in Indonesian and German.

== See also ==
- Presbyterian Church in Singapore
