= Provisional Admission Exercise =

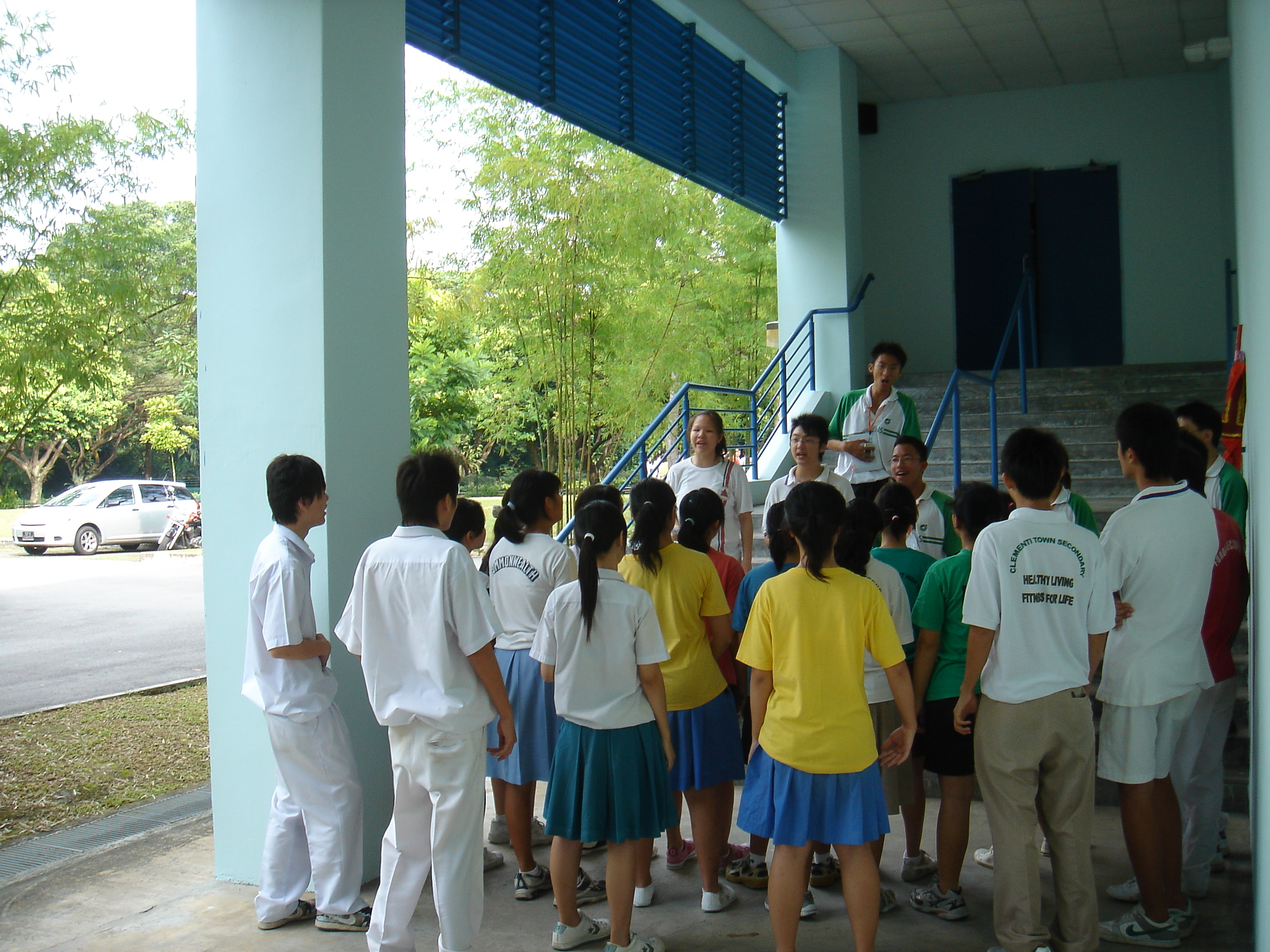
Orientation programme in a junior college, during PAE 2006. Students are allowed to wear the uniforms they wore during secondary school.

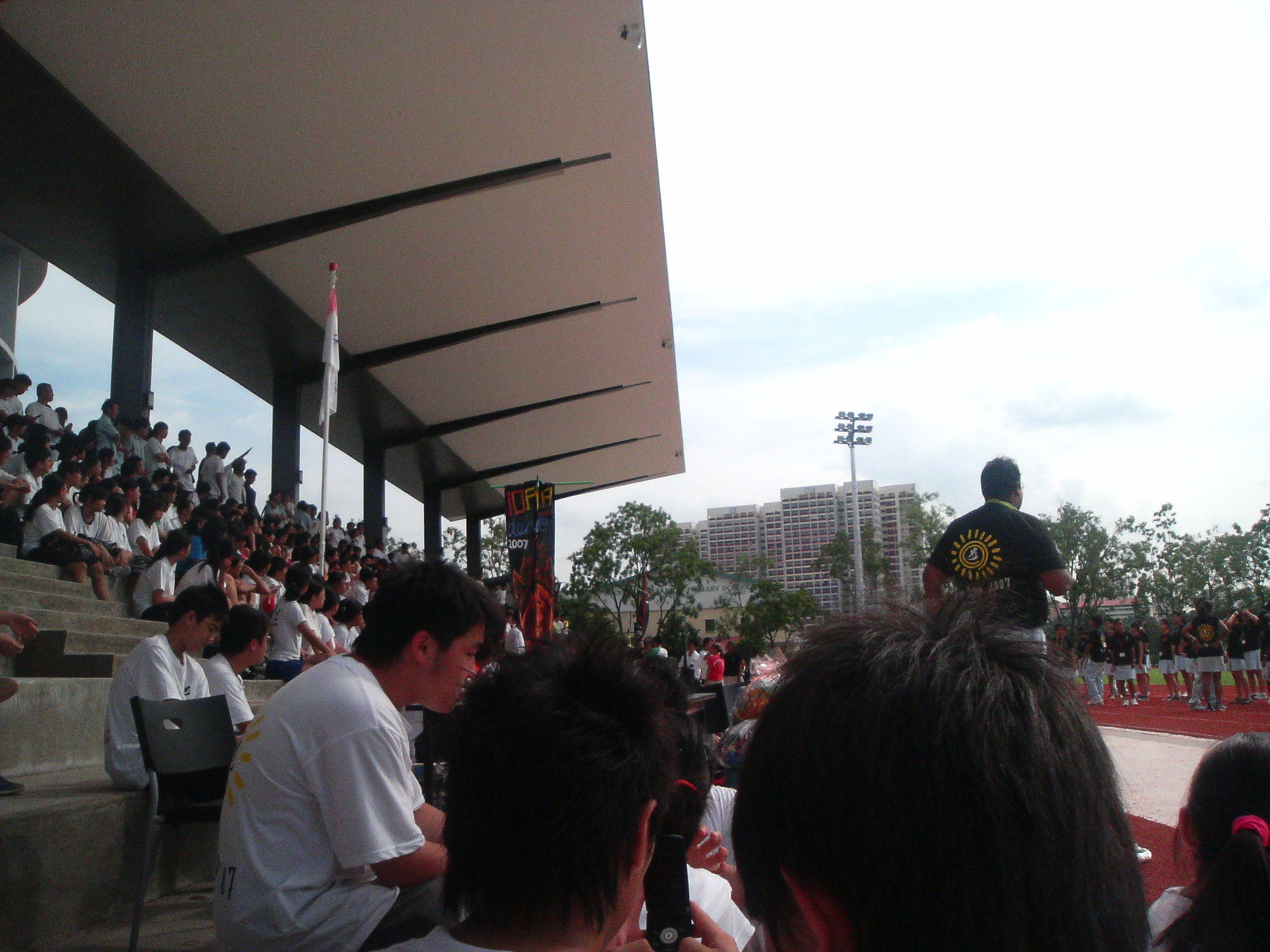
Orientation programme held at the institute stadium of Millennia Institute in 2007.

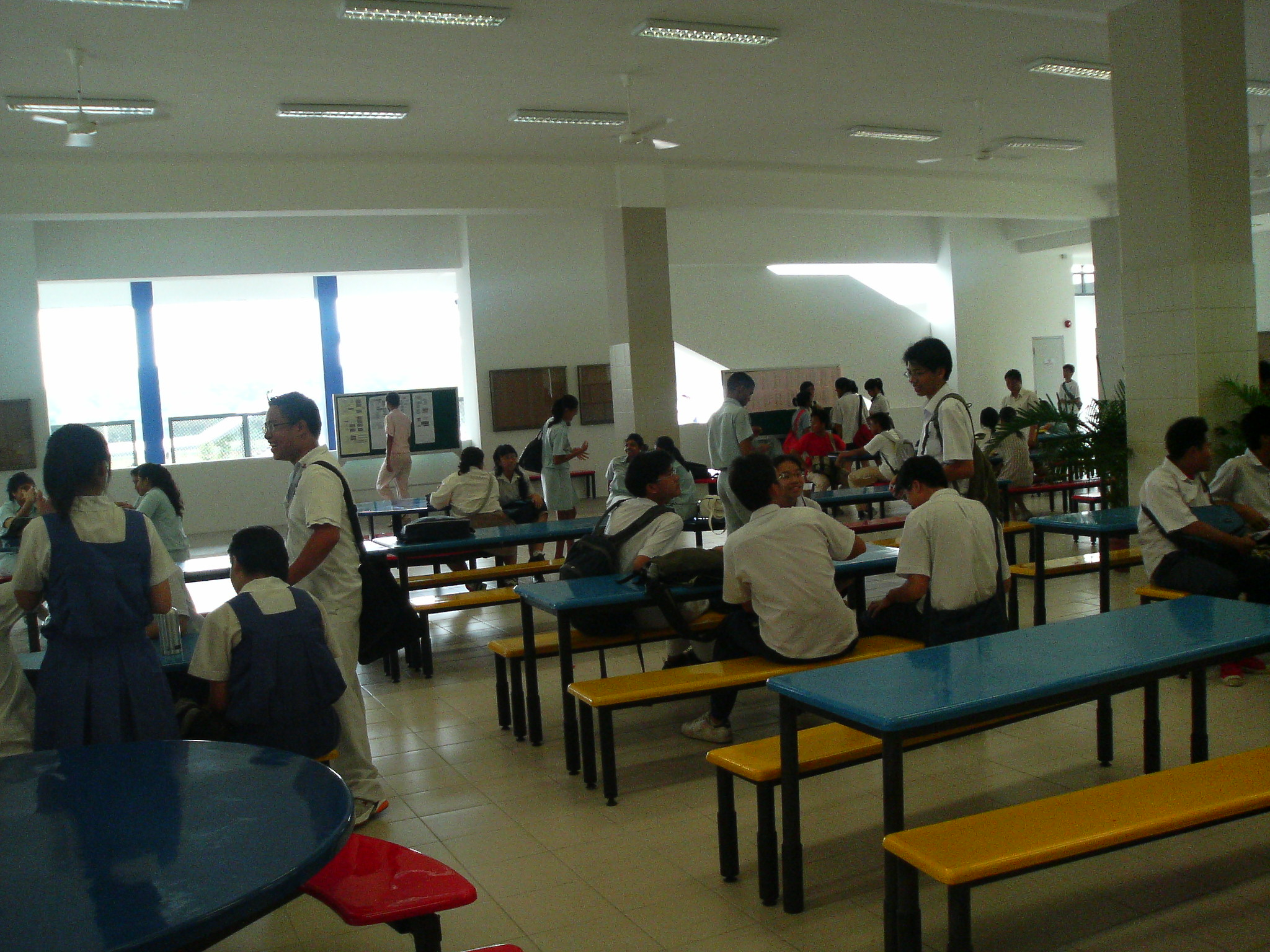
Break in the canteen during PAE 2007; PAE-admitted students wearing their secondary school uniforms.

The Provisional Admission Exercise (PAE), colloquially known as the first three months among Singapore students, was an interim exercise in which graduating Secondary 4 students in Singapore could choose to join a junior college or centralised institute for Term 1 in the following academic year, before the official release of the GCE 'O' level results. Students used the score of their respective secondary schools' internal preliminary examinations to apply under the programme.

== Programme ==
Most pre-university centres' orientation programmes during the PAE were longer than those held at the start of the actual pre-university academic year. Students usually made use of this period of time to socialise and enjoy themselves; their workload was greatly reduced, and cases of skipping classes were common. This is in stark contrast to the pressure-cooker stress that students usually undergo during a normal school term. Junior colleges in Singapore also made use of this period to organise many activities, with fun as an emphasis, in order to entice students to stay in their respective institutions after the PAE. This is particularly true if the junior college is not prominent for its academic-orientated performance.

During the PAE, students were permitted to wear uniforms of their secondary schools instead of those of the pre-university centre. The phenomenon of gate-crashing, or colloquially called crashing, arose from this loophole; in an act amounting to trespassing, students not affiliated to a school enter without prior consent from the school administration. Some students gatecrashed to enjoy the prestige of crashing a "good" pre-university centre; others did so to join their former schoolmates. It was also common to see students from different secondary schools exchanging their school uniforms with those from schools considered more recognised, mostly for the fun of it or in some cases, to escape the "neighbourhood school" stigma presented by their uniforms.

Critics claim that some secondary schools give an unfair advantage over their students, by either inflating grades for the internal preliminary examinations or making them easier. Students who choose to remain in the JCs after the PAE are awarded bonus 'loyalty' scores, which cuts off 2 points in their GCE 'O' Level grade, giving them a greater chance of remaining in the pre-university centre. However, the option to reduce one's score by 2 points is only applicable if the student scores an L1R5 of 20 points or less. School administrations struggled to cope with the admission procedures of two student batches in an academic year. It is also argued that in many cases, lessons had to be retaught as many students did not remain in the same pre-university centre after the PAE because some left for other JCs or polytechnics.

== End of PAE ==
The Ministry of Education had originally announced the consolidation of a single admission batch for pre-university centres from 2006 onwards, but due to administrative problems, the abolishment was delayed until 2009, making 2008 the last year with PAE. This coincides with the arrangement between SEAB and UCLES to cut short the marking period of papers.

== See also ==
- Culture of Singapore
- Education in Singapore
- Racial Harmony Day
