= Murder of Tan Lead Sane =

2008 murder of a politician's brother in Singapore

Tan Lead Sane
- Born: 陳力成 Tan Lead Sane (POJ: Tân Le̍k-sêng); 1975; Singapore
- Died: 28 June 2008 (aged 33); Paya Lebar, Singapore
- Cause of death: Stabbing to the chest and abdomen
- Resting place: Choa Chu Kang Christian cemetery
- Occupation: Computer engineer
- Known for: Murder victim
- Spouse: Huang Mei Zhe
- Children: 1 daughter, 1 son
- Parents: Tan Soo Phuan (father); Ng Bee Hion (mother)

On 28 June 2008, 25-year-old Wu Yun Yun (吴云云, pinyin: Wú Yúnyún; Báⁿ-uā-ci̍: Gó Eóng-eóng ), a Chinese national and wife of opposition politician Tan Lead Shake (陳力學, Pe̍h-ōe-jī: Tân Le̍k-ha̍k; pinyin: Chén Lìxué), used a fruit knife to stab both her brother-in-law and sister-in-law. The brother-in-law, who was Tan's 33-year-old brother Tan Lead Sane (陳力成, Pe̍h-ōe-jī: Tân Le̍k-sêng; pinyin: Chén Lìchéng), died after he sustained several knife wounds on his chest and abdomen, while the sister-in-law Huang Mei Zhe (黄美珠, pinyin: Huáng Měizhū), who was Tan Lead Sane's wife, survived the stabbing. Wu, who was said to have committed the stabbing due to mistreatment from her in-laws and jealousy towards the supposed better life of Tan and Huang, was charged with murder and attempted murder. Eventually, in November 2008, the charges were reduced to manslaughter and attempted manslaughter due to Wu suffering from depression at the time of the murder. Six months after she pleaded guilty, Wu was sentenced to 16 years in prison on 17 November 2009.

== Stabbing incident ==
On the early Saturday morning of 28 June 2008, at the Paya Lebar home of Tan Lead Shake, an opposition politician in Singapore, both his younger brother and his brother's wife were stabbed by the wife of Tan Lead Shake. The brother, Tan Lead Sane, was 33 years old when he was stabbed thrice on the chest and abdomen, and Tan, who worked as a computer engineer, eventually died in hospital. Tan's wife, 35-year-old Huang Mei Zhe, who came from China, was stabbed on her neck twice but survived with timely medical intervention. The deceased victim's sister-in-law, 25-year-old Chinese national and Singapore permanent resident Wu Yun Yun (Tan Lead Shake's wife), escaped from the house despite the efforts of Tan's 63-year-old mother Ng Bee Hion (黃美香, Pe̍h-ōe-jī: N̂g Bí-hiong; pinyin: Huáng Měixiāng) to stop her, and Wu had also injured Ng during the escape.

Wu got out of the house through the back gate and she went into hiding. She washed the bloodstains off her body using water from a drain near Serangoon Shopping Centre, and she disposed of her clothes at Toa Payoh Central, where she also changed into a new set of clothes. After that, Wu went to Hougang Avenue and Bugis Junction to continue hiding from the police. Subsequently, at around noon, Wu contacted her husband, wanting to meet him. Wu's husband agreed to arrange the meeting at National Library at Victoria Street, and he also managed to persuade Wu to surrender herself. At the same time, Wu's husband informed the police about his wife's whereabouts. Upon Wu's arrival at the location, the police apprehended Wu as a suspect for the murder of Tan and the stabbing of Huang, seven hours after the crime happened.

The funeral of Tan took place during the first week of July 2008, which was reportedly held in private and Huang was hysterical at the funeral wake. Tan was eventually laid to rest at Choa Chu Kang Christian cemetery. Tan's brother was said to have gone to the funeral while also attending the court session of his wife. Tan's 73-year-old father Tan Soo Phuan (陳樹芬, Pe̍h-ōe-jī: Tân Sū-hun; pinyin: Chén Shùfēn) reportedly never appeared in the funeral, which was attended by about a hundred people. Neighbours also told the media that they heard arguments coming from the victim's household, indicating that there was bad blood between Wu and her husband's family and it presumably led to the stabbing.

The stabbing of Tan by Wu was listed as one of Singapore's most violent crimes committed by foreigners from China in recent years; one of these other cases was the Yishun triple murders, which involved a 42-year-old Chinese national named Wang Zhijian, a native of Tianjin who murdered his girlfriend and two other females inside their rented flat in Yishun in September 2008. Wang was charged with murder and had since been sentenced to death.

== Criminal charges ==
=== Murder charge and remand ===
On 30 June 2008, two days after the stabbing, 25-year-old Wu Yun Yun was charged with murder for having knifed her brother-in-law Tan Lead Sane to death. Under Singaporean law, offenders found guilty of murder would be sentenced to death by hanging. Wu was also charged a week later with the attempted murder of Huang Mei Zhe and causing hurt to Ng Bee Hion. After Wu was charged, her father and other family members travelled from China to Singapore to provide moral support for her. The Chinese Embassy in Singapore also engaged Subhas Anandan, who was then the best criminal lawyer in Singapore, to defend Wu during her court proceedings for the murder of Tan Lead Sane. Wu was initially placed in psychiatric remand for three weeks, before a court order in late July 2008 extended the remand period for another three weeks. Wu was also brought back to the crime scene to re-enact the stabbing.

During her psychiatric remand, Dr George Fernandez, a consultant psychiatrist of the Institute of Mental Health (IMH), found that Wu was suffering from major depressive disorder, or depression for short, and the severity of the condition was so much so that it had significantly impaired her state of mind at the time of the stabbing.

=== Reduction of murder charge ===
On 3 November 2008, on behalf of his client, Anandan filed a motion to the courts, proposing that his client's murder charge should be amended to a lesser charge of culpable homicide not amounting to murder, also known as manslaughter in Singaporean legal terms, on the grounds of diminished responsibility. 15 days later, on 18 November 2008, the prosecution decided to, in light of the psychiatric reports of Wu's case, reduce the original charge of murder to one of manslaughter. The reduction of the murder charge allowed Wu to escape the death penalty for murdering Tan. Not only that, the second charge of attempted murder in relation to the stabbing of Huang was also lowered to one of attempted manslaughter. The news of Wu's manslaughter charge was relayed to Wu's family in China, and her father was reportedly relieved.

Wu's trial was set to take place tentatively in March 2009, and she also expressed her intention to plead guilty to both the lower charges. The stipulated punishment for manslaughter in Singapore was either life imprisonment or up to 20 years in jail, while the offence of attempted manslaughter carried the maximum sentence of 15 years in jail.

== Background ==
Wu Yun Yun
- 2008 police mugshot of Wu Yun Yun, who was convicted of killing her brother-in-law
- Born: 吴云云 Wú Yúnyún; 1982 (age 43–44); Putian, Fujian province, China
- Occupations: Telephone operator (China; former); Housewife (Singapore; former)
- Spouse: Tan Lead Shake (m. 2001; div. 2011)
- Children: 2
- Parent: Wu Jin Chi (father)
- Status: Released since 2024
- Convictions: Manslaughter (one count); Attempted manslaughter (one count)
- Criminal charges: Murder (one count); Attempted murder (one count); Voluntarily causing hurt (one count)
- Penalty: 16 years' imprisonment

Born in 1982 at a rural village in Putian, Fujian province, China, Wu Yun Yun, the second of three children, used to study at a vocational school before she dropped out due to her family's financial situation. After this, Wu worked as a telephone operator and was happy in her job, and had a close relationship with a male colleague whom Wu had feelings for. However, much to her reluctance, Wu's parents arranged for her to marry her Singaporean husband Tan Lead Shake, who was an opposition politician and a member of the Democratic Progressive Party (which was founded by Wu's father-in-law). Wu's husband was nicknamed the "Slipper Man" due to him having wore slippers on Nomination Day for the 1997 general election; he had lost twice in the general elections of 1997 and 2001. Wu first arrived in Singapore when she was 19 years old in November 2001, and married her husband a month after her arrival in Singapore. The couple had two children (one elder son and one younger daughter), and they lived together with the extended family of Wu's husband in Paya Lebar, consisting of Tan Lead Shake's two brothers Tan Lead Hand and Tan Lead Sane, Tan Lead Sane's wife Huang Mei Zhe and the Tan brothers' parents.

However, the marriage itself was reportedly not a happy one, because according to Wu, it was a loveless marriage and she was not close to her husband. Not only that, Wu was reportedly mistreated by her in-laws, and compared to Wu and her husband, Wu's mother-in-law Ng Bee Hion treated her younger son Tan Lead Sane (the murdered victim) and his wife Huang Mei Zhe much better. This led to Wu becoming jealous of her younger brother-in-law and his wife for having a better life than her, so much so that she finally cannot contain her emotions and thus committed the stabbing on 28 June 2008, which cost Tan Lead Sane his life and left Huang seriously injured. According to Dr Fernandez, the mistreatment and sadness Wu underwent were the contributory factors behind her depression.

Not only that, Wu's children were also mistreated by Tan and his wife, and her husband also did not allow her to go out of the house a lot, and to make matters worse, whenever Wu and her children visited her family in China, her father, who was unaware of the unhappy life she had in Singapore, nagged at her for staying too long during each of Wu's four visits, and aside from the unhappiness of her marriage life, the lack of understanding from her kin made Wu more depressed. Wu also found it difficult to adapt to the Singaporean way of life as she had no friends and she also cannot speak English and get accustomed to the local food, which were also among the contributory factors behind her depression, as cited by the psychiatric reports by Dr Fernandez. Wu's father also noticed her daughter getting irritable and thinner at each visit.

== Trial of Wu Yun Yun ==
=== Plea of guilt and submissions ===
On 17 April 2009, Wu Yun Yun officially stood trial at the High Court, with Subhas Anandan (and his nephew Sunil Sudheesan) continuing to represent Wu for the trial. Wu pleaded guilty to one count of manslaughter and one count of attempted manslaughter, and was accordingly convicted of both charges. Aside from her plea of guilt, a third preliminary charge of causing hurt to Tan's mother was consented by Wu to be taken into consideration during sentencing. The prosecution was led by Diane Tan, and the trial was presided by Justice Kan Ting Chiu, who adjourned the sentencing trial for six months while pending further psychiatric assessment from Dr Fernandez in order to better calibrate the appropriate sentence for Wu.

The prosecution sought the maximum sentence of life imprisonment for the first charge of manslaughter, citing that despite her psychiatric condition, Wu was able to premeditate and plan ahead to commit the stabbing and even bought the fruit knife a few weeks ahead to facilitate her crime, and selected her date and timing of the crime on a Saturday to make sure her husband was there to care of their children. On the other hand, the defense opposed the prosecution's submission for a life term, and they cited the mitigating factors like Wu's unhappy marriage and the mistreatment she and her children faced in the household, and they also stated that her psychiatric condition was still manageable with consistent treatment and there was a low likelihood for Wu to commit another offence after her release from prison, and hence she cannot be considered a menace to society and her case was unsuitable for the highest punishment of life in prison.

=== Sentencing ===
On 17 November 2009, Justice Kan Ting Chiu delivered his verdict on sentence. In his verdict, Justice Kan found that Wu did not deserve the maximum penalty of life imprisonment, because by reference of some precedent cases of mentally ill offenders like Aniza binte Essa (who served nine years in prison for abetting the manslaughter of her husband), the case of Wu Yun Yun was not one where it was appropriate to subject a mentally-ill offender to life in prison, since Wu's condition could still be addressed by treatment and she had shown some improvement despite the possibility of a relapse, and she also had a low propensity to re-offend, and therefore, Justice Kan agreed with the defence that Wu should be given a sentence lower than life for stabbing Tan to death and injuring Tan's wife.

Therefore, Justice Kan sentenced 27-year-old Wu Yun Yun to 12 years' imprisonment for the first charge of manslaughter, and four years' imprisonment for the second charge of attempted manslaughter. The judge additionally ordered the two jail terms to run consecutively and take effect from the date of Wu's arrest. In total, Wu was to serve a total of 16 years in prison.

== Aftermath ==
=== Reactions of trial verdict and Wu's divorce ===
In the aftermath of the incident, many of Wu's in laws have moved out of the house, including Tan's mother Ng Bee Hion, and his sister in law Huang Mei Zhe, who took her 2 children along with her. Neighbors have also noticed their house being much quiet since and reportedly, have not seen Ng or Huang for a long time.

Wu Yun Yun's 54-year-old father Wu Jin Chi (吴金池, pinyin: Wú Jīnchí; Báⁿ-uā-ci̍: Gó Ging-dí ), who was present in court with his 24-year-old son, told the press that he was deeply remorseful for marrying his daughter off to Singapore, and not knowing earlier about the unhappy life she suffered at the Tan family's household, even though Wu herself did not blame her father for her plight. Wu's father said he was assured that his daughter's welfare had improved while in prison, and also looked forward to Wu's release and return to China in the next few years' time.

As for Wu's in-laws, who all denied Wu's claims of unhappiness and mistreatment, they said that her sentence of 16 years was too light compared to a life sentence, and they reportedly refused to allow Wu's children to visit their mother in jail. Throughout the post-sentencing aftermath, Wu's husband Tan Lead Shake declined to comment on the case, though when told by his mother of Wu's sentence through a phone call, he said "Good". A news update in April 2011 revealed that Wu's husband had filed for divorce, and Wu's father accepted the divorce outcome. At some point, Tan reportedly lost his senior network administrator job, and upon gaining sole custody of the children, subsequently stayed home to look after them with a help of a maid. He has kept a low profile since, keeping mum about his current job and future political activities.

=== The Tan family's lawsuit against the Attorney-General ===
In the aftermath of Wu Yun Yun's sentencing trial, the surviving victim, Huang Mei Zhe, and her mother-in-law (Tan's mother) Ng Bee Hion, were both dissatisfied with the 16-year sentence, as they hoped for Wu to be sentenced to life in prison; Ng was still mourning the death of her youngest son even after Wu was incarcerated for the crime. Both Ng and Huang submitted several pleas to the prosecution to appeal to the Court of Appeal against Wu's sentence and asked that her sentence be raised from 16 years to life. However, the prosecution did not appeal, and the Attorney-General's Chambers (AGC) had corresponded with both Huang and Ng several times that there were no plans to appeal the sentence because it was not manifestly inadequate in comparison to the precedent cases and stipulated guidelines under the law. Afterwards, on 13 September 2010, both Huang and Ng filed a motion to the High Court, seeking to obtain a declaration that the Attorney-General had acted illegally and/or irrationally and/or with procedural impropriety in failing and/or refusing to appeal against Wu's sentence.

However, Justice Tan Lee Meng, who heard the motion, found that the motion itself was unsustainable and devoid of merit in nature given that the plaintiffs' arguments did not prove that the prosecution's decision to not appeal Wu's sentence was indicative of them having acted unconstitutionally or had been motivated by bad faith or extraneous circumstances, and there was no deprivation of the plaintiffs' right to equal protection under the law. Justice Tan stated that since the plaintiffs do not have legal rights with respect to the trial of Wu, the prosecution's decision to not appeal had not affected any of the legal rights of the plaintiffs, and the judge also held that the prosecution had the right to decide on whether or not to appeal and their discretion to do so was subject to judicial review. Hence, Justice Tan dismissed the motion on 22 February 2011.

=== Case mentioning by Subhas Anandan ===
Subhas Anandan, the former lawyer of Wu Yun Yun, wrote about her case in his second and last book, titled It's Easy to Cry, which was posthumously published in October 2015, nine months after Anandan died from a heart attack at age 67. Anandan, who was reported to have dictated the contents of his book while undergoing kidney dialysis and completed it before his death, recounted that when Wu Yun Yun was arrested for murdering Tan Lead Sane, he was briefed by the Chinese Embassy and Wu's family to defend Wu, and he decided to do so out of sympathy for Wu's father and sister, who came all the way from China to Singapore to provide moral support for her. Anandan said that he did not accept the case because of Wu's poverty or nationality, but because she deserved the best defence in her trial and he felt for her family's desperation to aid her and her need for help. Anandan was also sympathetic to Wu's unhappy life in Singapore and the circumstances that led to the fatal stabbing of Tan Lead Sane, and he mentioned that Wu's family was very financially poor to the extent that they had to stay in a boarding house during their trip to Singapore.

Not only that, Anandan stated that after they managed to have the murder charge reduced on the grounds of diminished responsibility, he felt that the trial judge Kan Ting Chiu was kind enough to not impose a life sentence, after he agreed to the mitigating factors Anandan emphasized in Wu's case, and since Wu had no visitors in Singapore, Anandan and his nephew Sunil Sudheesan would occasionally go to visit Wu at Changi Women's Prison, where she was serving her 16-year sentence, and Wu, who was gradually adapted to prison life, was reportedly grateful to Anandan and did not want to inconvenience him to visit her often. Anandan further revealed that Wu's sister requested to him to arrange for Wu to serve the remainder of her sentence in a China prison, which Anandan turned down as there was no law that could allow such an undertaking.

Anandan admitted that through the case of Wu Yun Yun and many other similar ones, he was unable to suppress his urge to feel compassion for other human beings, and he wanted to help while he had the ability to do so. He stated this was what he taught his son when he asked whether he wanted to be a lawyer and also reminded his son that he had the position to help others as a lawyer rather than doing the job for money. According to Anandan, Wu's sentence of 16 years carried the possibility of parole after completing at least two-thirds of her jail term (equivalent to ten years and eight months), provided that she maintained good behavior while behind bars.

== See also ==
- Life imprisonment in Singapore
- Capital punishment in Singapore
- List of major crimes in Singapore
