= Murder of Choo Xue Ying =

2008 case of a woman battered to death in Singapore

Choo Xue Ying
- Born: Choo Xue Ying c. 1961; Colony of Singapore
- Died: 16 October 2008 (aged 47); Bukit Batok Nature Park, Singapore
- Cause of death: Blunt force trauma to the head
- Other name: Jennifer Choo
- Education: University
- Occupation: Property agent (former)
- Employer: Propnex
- Known for: Murder victim
- Height: 1.53 m (5 ft 0 in)

On 16 October 2008, during a heated argument inside her car, 47-year-old Choo Xue Ying (Chinese: 朱雪莹; pinyin: Zhū Xǔeyíng), alias Jennifer Choo, was assaulted to death by a business partner Rosli bin Yassin, or Ali, at Bukit Batok Nature Park, where Choo's skeletal remains were discovered four days after her death. Rosli, who was later found to have committed cheating following the murder itself, was arrested and charged with killing Choo, and his girlfriend was also charged with abetting him to commit cheating. Rosli's murder charge was subsequently reduced to manslaughter, and after pleading guilty to the reduced charge and several other unrelated charges for cheating, Rosli was sentenced to 12 years of preventive detention on account of his long criminal record (since 1991), and subsequently, through the prosecution's appeal, Rosli's sentence of preventive detention was raised to the maximum of 20 years for the same reason, as well as due to his high risk of re-offending and his original sentence was manifestly inadequate.

== Discovery of body and identification ==
On 20 October 2008, while he was jogging at Lorong Sesuai near Bukit Batok Nature Park, 57-year-old Samuel Lye detected an extremely foul smell, and as he followed the source of the odour, he made a gruesome discovery of a highly decomposed corpse located within the vegetation of the park's forest. Lye immediately reported the shocking discovery to the police. It was not the first case of such nature, as in 2000, a woman was raped and murdered in the same park.

A team of police investigators, led by Inspector Kelvin Kwok, arrived at the scene to check the corpse, but the identity of the body was unknown. Dr Paul Chui, a forensic pathologist, inspected the body and told the police that the deceased was a female, most likely aged between 25 and 45, and the probable cause of death was a severe injury he found on the skull, and it was inflicted with blunt force trauma, and he believed that based on the extremely high degree of decomposition, the woman had died for about four days. At that stage when the fingerprints cannot be lifted, Dr Chui said that only the teeth could help the police identify the deceased. At the scene, the police also discovered tyre marks located narrowly between each other and broken glass, which suggested a small vehicle likely belonged to the killer or victim, and there were signs that the body might have been brought here for disposal. The belongings of the deceased discovered were photographed and published on the press to seek any leads to ascertain her identity, which remained unidentified for the next few days. Her rings and jewellery were untouched at the time her body was found.

Upon further autopsy, it was found that the deceased had "a fair amount of dental work" done, as she had three dental implants, as well as crowning in one premolar tooth with root canal treatment administered on the same premolar tooth, and a metal filing in the neighbouring tooth. After consulting several dental experts, and obtaining the serial number and brand of the victim's dental implants (which belonged to a foreign brand with a Singapore branch), which belonged to a batch that was imported to Singapore between January and June 2007, the police managed to narrow down the list of clinics in Singapore, all of which received the batch of implants. After several days of investigation and consultations with the shortlisted dental clinics, a dentist operating at Sims Avenue, Dr Leslie Boey, identified the dental records of the deceased, which matched to the ones in his clinic database. The deceased, according to Dr Boey's record, was 47-year-old Choo Xue Ying, a Singaporean citizen and property agent working under Propnex.

== Police investigations ==
=== Arrest of Rosli bin Yassin ===
Background profile of the late Choo Xue Ying, alias Jennifer Choo, revealed that she was single, and had two brothers and a mother who used to live at Sims Avenue, but they were not close, and she never contacted them for about six months before her death. Choo's brother said that his sister had gone to university before becoming a property agent, which she worked for years until her death. At the time she died, Choo was renting a room from her 82-year-old former neighbor and ex-client, Lu Zhen Zong, who told them that Choo moved into his Eunos flat months before her death and she treated him well and helped him do some household chores or make breakfast. Lu, who was saddened and shocked to hear about Choo's death, told them he last saw her about a week before the police arrived at his flat but he thought she was going on a business trip like she sometimes would. Choo's belongings were seized by the police for DNA testing and it was thus confirmed that the skeletal remains indeed belonged to Choo. Choo's colleagues noted she was a loner who did not speak to them much, and she had a few friends, and one of them from her workplace wrote a eulogy for her, describing her as a nice-mannered and beautiful person; she was also said to be a tough person. Later, Choo's car, a small, yellow Cherry QQ, was discovered abandoned at Jalan Kubor, and there were bloodstains with Choo's DNA inside the car, suggested that Choo was assaulted inside the car, and the broken glass found at the park were found to match the ones on Choo's car headlight.

Phone records were obtained from Choo's handphone, which was missing at the time her body was discovered, and it was found that the phone was still in use even after she died. The numbers dialed during that period were traced to three people: one of them was a 33-year-old Indonesian woman named Jelly, who was found to be an overstayer, another was a 51-year-old MRT station cleaner named Zubaidah binte Ali and a third was 46-year-old Adros bin Syed Omar. Both Zubaidah and Adros were interviewed by the police, and they both claimed that a man named "Ali" approached them. According to Zubaidah, Ali offered her a cleaning job at his company, and after they met a second time at a coffee shop, Ali left after borrowing her phone, and he never returned since, and the phone was missing. As for Adros, who was a friend of Ali and first met Ali in prison, he made a police report about Ali cheated him of his money, and he said Ali and his girlfriend, who was identified as Jelly, met Adros and wanted Adros to help him open a coffee shop, and also gave him cheques that were blank but contained signatures from Ali's lawyer as what Ali claimed. However, Adros was informed that the cheques were rejected due to the signatures were not the ones authorized. These cheques were later traced and they belonged to the alleged murder victim Choo Xue Ying, and the signatures were actually Choo's, but they were forged by Ali and Jelly. Ali and Jelly were thus classified as suspects for Choo's murder.

On 31 October 2008, after receiving intel that Ali and Jelly were hiding in Sentosa, the police arrested the couple at a hotel room. 49-year-old Ali, whose real name was Rosli bin Yassin, was charged with murder on 13 November 2008, and Jelly was charged for helping Rosli to commit cheating and forging Choo's cheques to help Rosli in his cheating scheme. Some of Rosli's cheating offences were also committed at least two months prior to the murder of Choo, who was an acquaintance of Rosli. Choo's brother, who reclaimed his sister's body for cremation and funeral proceedings, expressed that he was grateful and found closure with his sister's killer caught, in spite of the estranged relationship.

Subsequently, Rosli was ordered to stand trial for murder after a preliminary hearing in September 2010, and the trial date was scheduled on 25 October 2010. If Rosli was found guilty of murder, he would be sentenced to death.

=== Rosli bin Yassin's account ===
The following account was Rosli's version of events that led to the murder of Choo Xue Ying.

Rosli, who was released from prison in April 2008 for a cheating offence, first met Choo in July 2008, and they had a good working relationship, as Rosli would regularly introduce potential clients to Choo on dealings with property. According to Rosli, on the morning of 16 October 2008, Jelly and Rosli went to the Geylang East Community Library, where he met up with Choo for an upcoming business dealing. Jelly remained at the library after Choo and Rosli left the place and drove in Choo's car. As they were driving along Lorong Sesuai at Bukit Batok Nature Park, Choo and Rosli were allegedly arguing about a sum of S$500 that Choo owed to Rosli, and as the argument grew heated, Rosli grew angrier and therefore punched and kicked Choo inside the car, before it temporarily subsided with the pair agreeing to discuss the matter outside the car.

After alighting the car, Choo proclaimed she wanted to call the police and it led to Rosli assaulting Choo again and he also snatched Choo's mobile phone. This time round, Rosli punched and kicked Choo several times, and he also inflicted several blows to Choo's head, and Choo grew unconscious. The kicks caused by Rosli to her head resulted in traumatic head injuries that resulted in the eventual death of 47-year-old Choo Xue Ying. After abandoning Choo's body in the bushes of the park's forested area, Rosli drove away in Choo's car (which hit one of the trees in the process and caused the vehicle headlight to shatter) and abandoned it at Jalan Kubor, and he also stole Choo's handbag, phone and laptop (which Rosli sold for S$300), and Choo's cheques, which were used by Rosli and Jelly to cheat Adros.

== Trial of Rosli bin Yassin ==
=== Hearing of murder charge ===
Rosli bin Yassin
- Born: Rosli bin Yassin; 1959 (age 66–67); Colony of Singapore
- Other name: Ali
- Occupation: Mechanic (former)
- Spouse: Unnamed ex-wife
- Children: 2
- Status: Imprisoned at Changi Prison since 2012
- Convictions: Cheating (1991–1999); Theft (1991–1999); Forgery (1991–1999); Cheating and dishonestly inducing the delivery of property (1999); Cheating and dishonestly inducing the delivery of property (2008); Manslaughter (one count; 2011); Eight counts of cheating, theft, criminal breach of trust and forgery (2011)
- Criminal charges: Murder (one count; 2008); Multiple charges of cheating, theft, criminal breach of trust and forgery (1991–2008)
- Penalty: At least three or more unspecified jail terms (1991–1999); Eight years' preventive detention (1999); 12 months' imprisonment (2008); 20 years' preventive detention (2013)

In October 2010, 50-year-old Rosli bin Yassin stood trial at the High Court for one count of murdering Choo Xue Ying back in 2008. Jelly, Rosli's accomplice, was called to give evidence as the prosecution's key witness, and she testified about her knowledge that Rosli had killed Choo Xue Ying per his admission to her, although the defence tried to raise doubts over her reliability as a witness and pointed out how she lied on several occasions to the police, and accused her of being part of the murder when Choo was assaulted to death. At that point, Jelly was already in prison serving a jail term of 36 months for overstaying and abetting Rosli to cheat. Despite the defence's attempt to impeach Jelly as a witness, her evidence was still accepted by the trial court. Jelly, who was also fined S$3,000 for her role in Rosli's case, was subsequently repatriated to Indonesia after her release.

=== Manslaughter charge and submissions ===
Subsequently, the trial was adjourned after two days of hearing. Before the resumption of Rosli's trial, the prosecution agreed to the defence's request to reduce the murder charge to one of culpable homicide not amounting to murder, also known as manslaughter in Singaporean legal terms, and Rosli therefore avoided the possibility of a death sentence for Choo's murder. The crime of manslaughter was punishable by either a jail term of up to 20 years, or life imprisonment. Rosli pleaded guilty to the manslaughter charge in September 2011, as well as several other charges of cheating, theft, criminal breach of trust and abetment of forgery. Rosli reportedly did not feel happy about escaping the gallows and proclaimed he rather be hanged than spending a long period behind bars.

During the submissions on sentence, Rosli's case was assessed to be suitable for preventive detention, a special type of imprisonment reserved for recalcitrant offenders above the age of 30 and with at least three antecedents since age 16, and does not allow the possibility of parole after two-thirds of the jail term even with good behaviour behind bars. Rosli's first conviction was dated back in 1991 when he was 31 years old, and since then, Rosli was repeatedly in and out of jail for about 16 offences including cheating, theft and forgery. In fact, this was not the first time Rosli faced a sentence of preventive detention; he was ordered in April 1999 to serve eight years of preventive detention for cheating and dishonestly inducing the delivery of property, and had escaped during the final leg of his detention order, and he therefore spent the final period of the order and another jail term for his escape. Rosli himself also served 12 months' jail for cheating and dishonestly inducing the delivery of property before his release in April 2008, from which point he committed a series of cheating crimes and finally the killing of Choo.

Bringing the case before Justice Woo Bih Li, who presided the sentencing hearing, the trial prosecutor Lau Wing Yum argued that Rosli should be sentenced to the maximum of 20 years' preventive detention. He argued that based on his long criminal record his latest spate of offences, which not only involved cheating but also resulted in the unlawful death of an innocent woman, Rosli was "a menace to society" and he also had a high risk of re-offending and exhibited no remorse for his actions, and thus Rosli should be given the maximum sentence of preventive detention for the protection of society for the longest period permitted under the law. Rosli's lawyer Wong Siew Hong did not dispute the prosecution's case against Rosli, but he argued that Rosli's risk of re-offending was only confined to non-violent offences and his killing of Choo was the first violent offence Rosli committed and it was uncharacteristic of him, and he was unlikely to commit violent offences upon his release. They also cited that Rosli did not have violent antecedents and his criminal record consisted of property offences, and the maximum preventive detention sentence was only reserved for recalcitrant offenders with violent antecedents, claimed trial, or possessed a very long criminal history, and Rosli was not one of those fitting the criteria, and hence, his preventive detention order should be less than 20 years. Aside from this, clinical psychiatrist Dr Tommy Tan found that Rosli had mild intellectual disability, lack of remorse, impulsive behaviour, lack of social and familial support and lack of occupational skills, which contributed to his high-level recalcitrance.

=== Sentencing ===
On 11 May 2012, Justice Woo delivered his sentencing verdict. He found that the aggravating circumstances of Rosli's case, like the high possibility of recidivism during his post-release, his long criminal history and the lack of remorse, were sufficient to call for a sentence of preventive detention, and since Rosli repeatedly commit property offences against many innocent people, he was considered a menace to society, and noted that Rosli's non-violent criminality had evolved into the act of killing another person, which was a huge concern posed to the court. Still, Justice Woo noted that it was uncharacteristic of Rosli to exhibit violence and commit crimes of such nature, and his risk of re-offending was only confined to cheating and other property-related crimes. He also pointed out that Rosli's conduct of disposing of Choo's body was callous and his use of Choo's cheques to cheat more people was corroborative of Rosli's remorseless behaviour.

Justice Woo referred to precedent cases of preventive detention sentences, and he decided that the maximum period of 20 years' preventive detention was manifestly excessive due to Rosli not having prior history of violent offences like those precedent cases, and some other extenuating circumstances in favour of Rosli. He also took into account Rosli's time of remand before his trial, and therefore, he sentenced Rosli to preventive detention for 12 years, and the sentence was to take effect from the date of his sentencing.

== Prosecution's appeal ==
On 15 January 2013, the prosecution appealed against Rosli's jail term of 12 years, and after hearing it, the Court of Appeal's three judges - Judges of Appeal Chao Hick Tin, Andrew Phang and V K Rajah - allowed the appeal and ruled that Rosli should be sentenced to the maximum of 20 years' preventive detention.

In their full grounds of decision in March 2013, the Court of Appeal accepted the prosecution's arguments that Rosli was a menace to society and his original sentence of 12 years was manifestly inadequate. They conceded that while Rosli's killing of Choo was his first violent offence and it was uncharacteristic of him, but they stated that it was extremely worrying that Rosli's non-violent criminal conduct had escalated into the taking of a human life, which the judges described as "one of the most egregious and blameworthy crimes on the books", and felt that it was irrelevant to determine whether it was uncharacteristic or not for him to do so. They also found that Rosli "lacked remorse and was incorrigible", since he had used Choo's cheques to commit more cheating offences before he was caught, and also based on his psychiatric report.

Furthermore, the appellate judges observed that Rosli did not have any strong familial support, given that Rosli was not in contact with his ex-wife and children, and was not close to his other relatives, and he had a lack of pro-social peers. Given that Rosli himself had no marketable skills and was of advanced age, there was a low chance he would be gainfully employed after his release and he might return to a life of crime as the only means to support himself financially. They cited the fact that Rosli was unable to stay out of prison for periods of more than ten months since his first conviction in 1991, and the previous jail terms, including Rosli's first preventive detention of eight years in 1999, was little rehabilitative effect on him, which supported his high propensity to commit another crime.

On these grounds, the Court of Appeal amended Rosli's sentence of 12 years to the maximum of 20 years' preventive detention. Rosli is currently serving his jail term at Changi Prison since the end of the prosecution's appeal.

== Aftermath ==
In 2013, Singaporean crime show Crimewatch re-enacted the case of Choo Xue Ying's murder and the subsequent cheating crimes of Rosli. The episode also depicted the process of the investigators finding out her identity with the help of her dental records.

In 2013, Singaporean crime show In Cold Blood also re-enacted the case as the 11th episode of the show's third and final season. The names of Choo and Rosli were changed to Mindy and Rafi respectively to protect their identities, and Jelly's name was changed to Coco for a similar purpose. There were several differences; Choo, who was portrayed by Singaporean actress Wendy Toh, was depicted to be younger than her real-life counterpart, and when her body was found, it was not in a highly decomposed state and not a skeleton in comparison to the discovery of her body in real life. Also, in this re-enactment, Rosli, portrayed by Raffi Khan, was depicted to have one elder brother, although it was not known if Rosli had any siblings in real life.

Liz Porter, a crime writer from Australia, included Rosli bin Yassin's case in her 2017 real-life crime book Crime Scene Asia: When Forensic Evidence Becomes the Silent Witness. The book was about murder cases from Asia that were solved through forensic evidence; these recorded cases came from Asian countries like Singapore, Malaysia and Hong Kong.

In June 2022, local writer Foo Siang Luen wrote the second volume of his real-life crime book Justice Is Done, which was published by the Singapore Police Force (including a digital download-for-free e-book version) 17 years after Foo wrote the first volume. The book recorded some of the gruesome murder cases encountered and solved by police throughout the years between 2005 and 2016, and the 2008 case of Choo Xue Ying's death was recorded as one of these cases covered in the book.

== See also ==
- List of major crimes in Singapore
