= Myint Thein =

- မြင့်သိန်း

Member of the Burmese House of Representatives for Kyaikmaraw Township
- Preceded by: Constituency established
- Succeeded by: Constituency abolished
- Majority: 10,576 (53%)

Personal details
- Born: 8 October 1947 Nganzon, Sagaing Division, British Burma
- Died: 28 March 2008 (aged 60) Singapore
- Party: National League for Democracy
- Children: 4
- Occupation: Politician

Myint Thein (Burmese: မြင့်သိန်း, IPA: [mjɪ̰ɰ̃ θéiɰ̃]; 8 October 1947 – 28 March 2008) was a Burmese pro-democracy activist and spokesman for the National League for Democracy (NLD), the political party of Aung San Suu Kyi. He regularly met with journalists, usually in secret, both inside and outside Myanmar, in order to draw international attention to the pro-democracy struggle against the military government of the country.

Myint Thein first became active in Burma's pro-democracy movement in 1988. During that same year, thousands of Burmese civilians were killed by the military during a pro-democracy uprising against the government. He also became active in politics. He was first elected as an MP in 1990 in Kyaikmaraw Township, a constituency in the country's Mon State, which is heavily populated by Burma's Mon people. He became a leading party official in Mon State's National League for Democracy following the Burmese general election of 1990 in which Aung San Suu Kyi's NLD took the majority of the seats in the Burmese parliament. The results were ignored by the Burmese generals who overturned the election and imprisoned NLD members.

Myint Thein remained a close ally of the NLD's imprisoned leader, Aung San Suu Kyi. He was appointed the party spokesperson in 2004.

Myint Thein was imprisoned numerous times encompassing several years between 1988 and 2007. His most recent imprisonment occurred during the crackdown on the 2007 Burmese anti-government protests by Burmese civilians and the country's revered Buddhist monks. He was held at the Insein Prison, a notorious prison located in Rangoon. His health rapidly deteriorated while he was incarcerated at Insein, and he was released in October 2007. Doctors diagnosed him with gall bladder problems and severe gastritis. His doctors recommended that he travel to Singapore for immediate medical treatment.

It took two months for Myint Thein to get the needed permission from the military junta to leave Burma for treatment in Singapore. Government authorities refused to speed up the process. He was finally allowed to leave Burma for Singapore at the end of January 2008. He was diagnosed with stomach cancer at Singapore General Hospital.

Myint Thein died in Singapore on 28 March 2008, at the age of 60. He was survived by his wife and three sons and one daughter.
