= Internet in Singapore =

In Singapore, there are 11,512,900 broadband Internet subscribers (as of February 2015). There are three major Internet service providers in Singapore, namely, Singtel, StarHub, and M1 and other growing providers like MyRepublic and ViewQwest. Over the years, the Singapore Government has been promoting the usage of broadband Internet access, as part of its Intelligent Nation 2015 (iN2015) and Smart Nation initiative.

Internet access is readily available in Singapore, with a connectivity rate of over 99%. Surveys have also indicated a significant emotional connectedness between Singaporeans with their internet access. In August 2018, Ookla's tests determined that Singapore's broadband speed of 181.47 Mbit/s is the highest in the world.

== History ==
Before the Internet, Singapore was the first country in the world to launch an interactive information service to the public. A service known as Teleview was jointly developed by Telecom Authority of Singapore (TAS) and GEC-Marconi of the UK. The service was set up as a public service and started trials during late 1987 using specifically designed terminals. This was expanded in 1989, and eventually, as Personal Computers became more capable, there was a software/hardware addition made available for the PC. Early service providers for editorials were Singapore Press Holdings, Housing Development Board and Singapore Stock Exchange, which provided a range of services, including general news, business news, housing lots and selection lists, real-time stocks and shares prices.

Subscribers connected to the Teleview service by SingTel via a dialup connection. Pages with images were sent to the terminal by Full Field Teletext transmissions from dedicated data inserters/UHF TV Transmitters. Initially, there were no service charges for the Teleview service but service charges were levied later on. A later development from Teleview provided an interfaced connection to the Internet. Subscribers were given access to the Internet via a text-only terminal; email was accessed by Pine, and webpages were viewed by Lynx. Teleview eventually became obsolete with SingNet offering access to the Internet via SLIP/PPP over modem.

In a government-led initiative to connect the island in a high-speed broadband network using various mediums such as fibre, DSL and cable, the Singapore ONE project was formally announced in June 1996, and commercially launched in June 1998. By December 1998, Singapore ONE is available nationwide with the completion of the national fibre optics network.

In 1997, commercial trials for Singapore Telecommunications' (Singtel) ADSL-based "SingTel Magix" service were undertaken in March, before being launched in June. Also in June, Singapore Cable Vision commenced trials for its cable modem based services, before being commercially deployed in December 1999. Singtel's ADSL service was subsequently rolled out on a nationwide scale in August 2000.

In January 2001, the Broadband Media Association was formed to promote the broadband industry. By April the same year there were six broadband Internet providers, with the total number of broadband users exceeding 300,000. Pacific Internet introduced wireless broadband services in October 2001.

In December 2006, Infocomm Development Authority of Singapore (IDA) introduced a programme named "Wireless@SG". It is part of its Next Generation National Infocomm Infrastructure initiative. It offers everyone free wireless access in high human-traffic areas, including the Central Business District, downtown shopping belts like Orchard Road, and residential town centres. As at June 2007, there are more than 460,000 subscribers and 4,200 hotspots under the Wireless@SG programme. By April 2013 the access speed had increased to 2 Mbit/s in April 2013.The free service was planned to continue until 31 March 2017.

In early August 2010, internet service providers in Singapore rolled out the Next Generation Nationwide Broadband Network (Next Gen NBN) service plans. The Next Gen NBN is Singapore's nationwide ultra-high speed fibre network. It offered broadband speeds of up to 1 Gbit/s at comparable prices to ADSL and cable connection. As of July 2013, Next Gen NBN has been deployed to over 95% of homes and businesses in Singapore.

== Dial-up access ==
Access to the Internet via Teleview-SingNet evolved to a full-fledged dial-up service known as SingNet, a subsidiary of SingTel. The formerly-private TechNet network was purchased by Pacific Internet. A third ISP was Cyberway; it was eventually purchased by StarHub on 21 January 1999.

== Broadband access ==
In a government-led initiative to connect the island in a high-speed broadband network using various mediums such as fibre, DSL and cable, the Singapore ONE project was formally announced in June 1996, and commercially launched in June 1998. By December 1998, Singapore ONE is available nationwide with the completion of the national fibre optics network.

In 1997, commercial trials for SingTel ADSL-based "SingTel Magix" service were undertaken in March, before being launched in June. Also in June, Singapore Cable Vision commenced trials for its cable modem based services, before being commercially deployed in December 1999. Singtel's ADSL service was subsequently rolled out on a nationwide scale in August 2000.

In 2006, M1 introduced its broadband services.

In November 2014, ViewQwest unveiled plans for a 2 Gbit/s fibre broadband service for households in Singapore, offering the country's fastest internet connection in the market. In March 2015, the service was officially launched making it the world's fastest home broadband plan alongside Japan.

Cable and ADSL services were withdrawn permanently in June 2016, with existing customers slowly being phased out. Singtel has announced complete shutdown and transfer of its ADSL customers by April 2018. StarHub has announced complete shutdown of cable customers by June 2019.

In January 2016, M1 introduced the first 10 Gbit/s fibre broadband service for businesses, offering the country's first fibre broadband service exceeding 2 Gbit/s.

In August 2016, Colt launched dedicated bandwidth, business-grade internet services for enterprises in Singapore.

In August 2018, Singapore's broadband speed of 181.47 Mbit/s was ranked the highest in the world.

== Censorship ==
In Singapore, Internet services provided by the three major Internet service providers are subject to regulation by the Media Development Authority (MDA) to block a "symbolic" number of websites containing "mass impact objectionable" material, including Playboy, YouPorn and Pornhub.

== ISPs ==
=== Optical fibre broadband providers ===
==== Networking company ====
- NetLink Trust (Formerly OpenNet) (Passive Infrastructure Company; NetCo; Wholesale)

==== Operating company ====
- Nucleus Connect (Active Infrastructure Company; OpCo; Wholesale)

==== Retail service providers ====
- M1
- Singtel
- StarHub
- MyRepublic
- ViewQwest
- WhizComms (Using Singtel infrastructure)
- Simba Telecom

=== Wireless@SG (Wi-Fi) operators ===
Free access; Minimally 5 Mbit/s

- M1
- Singtel
- StarHub

=== Mobile broadband providers ===
3G/4G LTE Network

- MNOs:
  - Singtel (includes sub-brand GOMO)
  - StarHub (includes sub-brand Giga!)
  - M1
  - SIMBA (formerly TPG Telecom)
- MVNOs:
  - Circles.Life (on M1's network)
  - Zero1 (on Singtel's network)
  - MyRepublic (on StarHub's network, on M1's network from 1 Apr 2020)
  - redOne (on StarHub's network)
  - VIVIFI (on Singtel's network)
  - geenet mobile (on M1's network)
  - CMLink SG (on Singtel's network)
  - Changi Mobile (on M1's network)

== IXPs ==
There are currently multiple Internet Exchange Points available in Singapore:

- Singapore Internet Exchange
- Singapore Open Exchange
- Equinix Internet Peering Exchange
