= Telecommunications in Singapore =

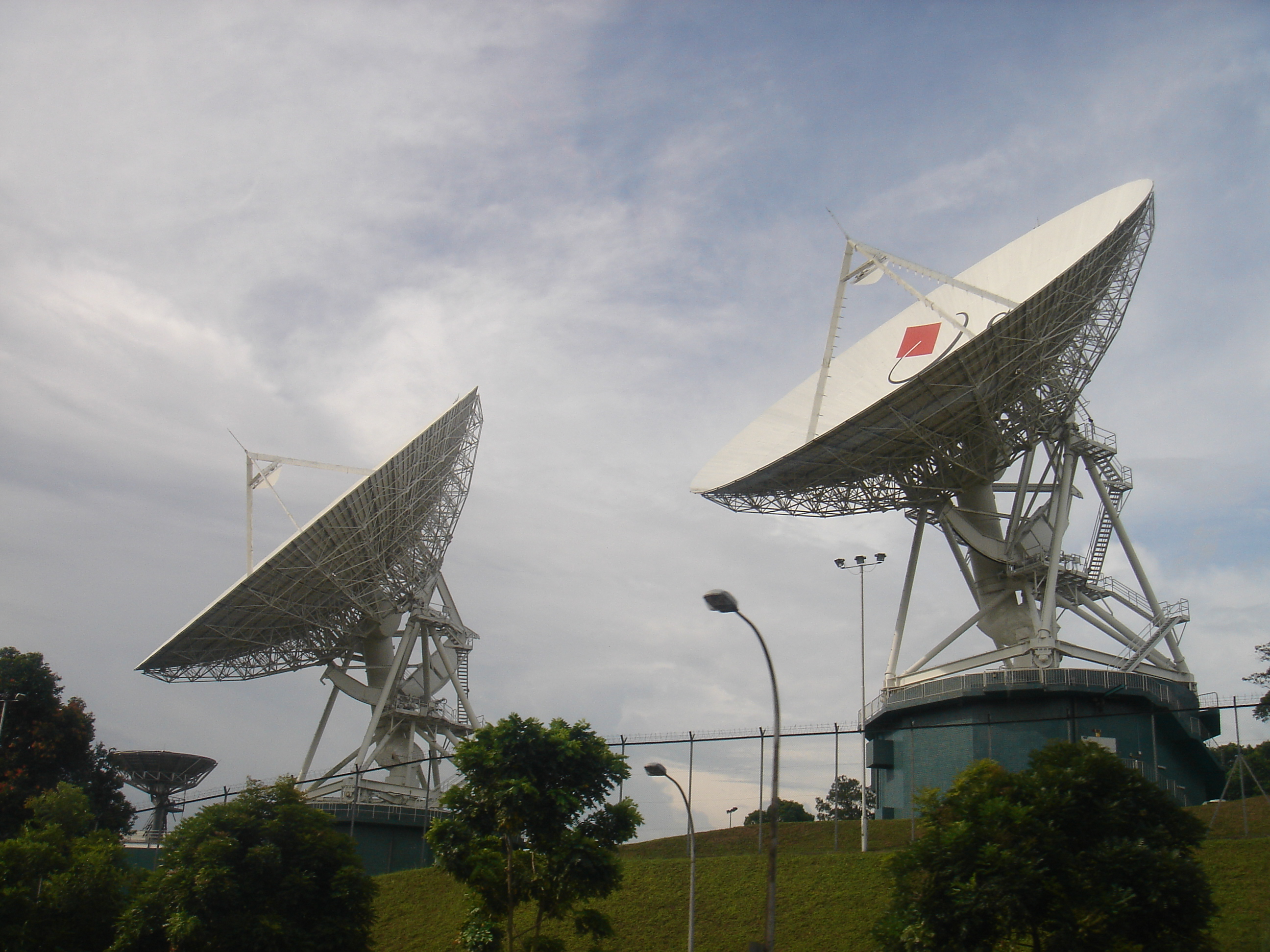
Satellite dishes of the Bukit Timah Satellite Earth Station, along the Bukit Timah Expressway.

The telecommunication infrastructure of Singapore spans the entire city-state. Its development level is high, with close accessibility to the infrastructure from nearly all inhabited parts of the island and for all of the population, with exceptions. Today, the country is considered an international telecommunications hub, an achievement that was driven by Singapore's view that high-quality telecommunications is one of the critical factors that support its economic growth.

== Background ==
After reform initiatives, the Singaporean telecommunication industry became streamlined and largely directed by the government, which viewed such policy as critical in shaping societal preferences and in directing the state's economy. Being able to provide adequate telecommunications services is also critical when approached from the perspective that Singapore's legitimacy as a state rests on its capability to deliver a high standard of living to its citizens. Hence, beginning in the 1970s, the state pursued a three-phase strategy oriented towards developing world-class telecommunications infrastructure capable of high-quality telecommunications services.

The first phase involved the expansion of infrastructure to meet business and societal needs (e.g. service enhancement, reduction of waiting lists for telephone connections). The second phase involved the integration of telecommunications to the over-all state strategy, particularly in the area of services for banking, financial services, and tourism with the goal of tapping telecommunications in ensuring the competitive advantage for Singapore. The National Computer Board was formed during this period for the purpose of developing and adopting IT applications. In 1986, this agency issued Singapore's comprehensive National Information Technology Plan (NITP). By the late 1980s, the third phase commenced and it focused on bolstering Singapore's international role as well as the IT 2000, which was an ambitious plan to encourage new multimedia services, which is articulated in the promotion of Singapore as "an intelligent island".

The government's role in the telecommunication industry is best demonstrated in the case of Singtel, which the state controls through its investment company Temasek Holdings Private Limited. Singtel does not only roll out affordable, high-quality telecommunication services to the city's residents, but it also pursues initiatives that will attract overseas companies to invest in the country.

Radio and television stations are all government-owned entities. All six television channels are owned by MediaCorp; its only other competitor, SPH MediaWorks closed its television channel on 1 January 2005. Due to the proximity of Singapore to Malaysia and Indonesia, almost all radios and television sets in Singapore can pick up broadcast signals from both countries. Private ownership of satellite dishes is banned, but most households have access to the StarHub TV and the Singtel IPTV TV(mio TV) network.

All radio stations are operated either by MediaCorp, the SAFRA National Service Association (SAFRA) or SPH UnionWorks.

As of 1998, there were almost 55 million phone lines in Singapore, close to 47 million of which also served other telecommunication devices like computers and facsimile machines. Underwater telephone cables have been laid that lead to Malaysia, the Philippines and Indonesia.

In 2002, Virgin Mobile in a joint venture with Singtel, set up the fourth telecommunications company in Singapore. It was the first mobile virtual network operator (MVNO) in Singapore. The operations were closed down on 11 October 2002 after failing to attract a significant number of customers. Failure of the joint venture was attributed to a saturated mobile market and Virgin Mobile's positioning as a "premium" brand.

As for internet facilities, as of 2009, there are four major Internet service providers (ISPs) in Singapore. By February 2009, there were more than 4.8 million broadband users in Singapore. However, due to the small market and possible market collusion, there have been rising concerns that various ISPs' telecommunication infrastructures being highly under-utilised. In July 2015, Liberty Wireless signed an agreement with M1 Limited that allowed it to tap on M1's mobile network, thus becoming the first MVNO, operating as Circles Asia, in Singapore to offer a full service mobile network experience.

On 14 December 2016, TPG, an Australian ISP, won the bid to be Singapore's fourth telecommunications company at S$105 million. By 2019, due to the introduction of TPG and 9 MVNO entrants to the market, thus turning the market to be more competitive, the price of mobile plans had fallen.

As of January 2018, there are four cellular phone operators in Singapore serving more than 6.4 million cellular phones.

In August 2025, M1 telco business was acquired by Simba, and MyRepublic was acquired by StarHub. Thus, resulting in three telco operators in Singapore, namely Singtel, Simba and Starhub.

== Telephones ==
Telephones – fixed line:

- Total Fixed Line Subscriptions: 2,041,000 (December 2024)
- Fixed Line Population Penetration: 33.8% (December 2024)

Telephones – mobile market:

- Total Mobile Subscriptions (3G+4G+5G): 9,963,500 (December 2024)
- Mobile Population Penetration: 165.0% (2024)
- Operators:
  - MNOs:
    - Singapore Telecommunications Ltd (Singtel)
    - StarHub Ltd
    - M1 Limited
    - SIMBA Telecom Pte Ltd (formerly TPG Singapore)
  - MVNOs:
    - Circles.Life (on M1's network)
    - CMLink SG (on Singtel's network)
    - CUniq SG (on StarHub's network)
    - eight Telecom (sub-brand of StarHub)
    - giga! (sub-brand of StarHub)
    - hi! by Singtel (sub-brand of Singtel; merger of Singtel hi! Prepaid and heya)
    - GOMO (sub-brand of Singtel)
    - Maxx (sub-brand of M1)
    - MyRepublic Mobile (on StarHub's network)
    - Swap Mobile (on StarHub's network)
    - VIVIFI (on Singtel's network)
    - Zero1 (on Singtel's network)
    - ZYM Mobile (on Singtel's network)
  - Niche (trunked radio for public safety and other industrial uses):
    - GRID Communications (iDEN and LTE networks)
    - CitiCall Communications (NEXEDGE-based)
- Ceased operators:
  - Former MVNOs which ceased operations:
    - Changi Mobile (July 2021 - February 2026)
    - Geenet mobile (March 2020 - December 2025)
    - redONE Mobile SG (July 2019 - June 2026)
    - ZΩH (August 2022 - December 2023)
    - Gorilla Mobile (June 2021 - January 2023)
    - Grid Mobile (June 2019 - 6 December 2021)
    - Zero Mobile (December 2017 - March 2020)
    - Virgin Mobile Singapore (October 2001 - July 2002)

Telephone system:

- Domestic: NA
- International: Submarine cables to several countries and territories including Malaysia (Sabah and Peninsular Malaysia), Indonesia, the Philippines, Hong Kong, Taiwan, and India; satellite earth stations – 2 Intelsat (1 Indian Ocean and 1 Pacific Ocean), and 1 Inmarsat (Pacific Ocean region)

IDD Country Code: +65

== Radio ==
Radio broadcast stations (as of November 2025): AM 0, FM 16, shortwave 1 (Source: Asiawaves.net )

Radios:2.55 million (1997)

== Television ==
Television broadcast stations (as of September 11, 2020):

- 6 free-to-air (6 digital, 6 high-definition)
  - Channel 5
  - Channel 8
  - Suria
  - Vasantham
  - Channel U
  - CNA (Channel NewsAsia)

Operators:

- Mediacorp - Free-to-Air TV Provider
- StarHub TV - Fibre IPTV Provider
- Singtel TV - Fibre IPTV Provider

== Internet ==
Singapore has a large number of computer users and most households have computers and Internet access. A survey conducted by Infocomm Development Authority of Singapore indicated that 78% of households own computers at home and 7 in 10 households have Internet access (2006). The CIA's The World Factbook reports that Singapore has 2.422 million Internet users (2005) and 898,762 Internet hosts (2006).

Country code (Top level domain): SG

Internet service providers (ISPs): 9 (2026)

Broadband

- Subscribers: 12,733,000 (with a residential Wired Broadband Household Penetration Rate of 93.0% and a wireless broadband population penetration rate of 184.1%) as of December 2024

Fibre Internet

Singapore's National Broadband Network (NBN) consists of three distinct layers; the Network Company (NetCo) which owns and operates the passive fibre network infrastructure, the Operating Company (OpCo) which owns and manages the active network equipment, and the Retail Services Provides (RSP) which retails fibre broadband packages to end users.

The fibre network infrastructure is owned and operated by NetLink Trust, the appointed NetCo. NetLink's network provides nationwide coverage to residential and non-residential premises in Singapore and its connected islands. With the exception of Nucleus Connect, the rest of the OpCos are also RSPs. Some of the licensed RSPs are Singtel, Starhub, M1, MyRepublic, ViewQwest and WhizComms. More than 90% of households in Singapore have high-speed wired broadband.

Optical Fiber broadband providers:

- StarHub (RSP)
- Singtel (RSP)
- M1 (RSP)
- SIMBA (RSP)
- MyRepublic (RSP)
- ViewQwest (RSP)
- WhizComms (RSP)
- eight Telecom (RSP)
- GOMO Broadband (RSP)
- NetLink Trust (Passive Infrastructure Company; NetCo; Wholesale)
- Nucleus Connect (Active Infrastructure Company; OpCo; Wholesale)

Wireless@SG operators (Min speed of 5 Mbit/s):

- M1
- Singtel
- StarHub
- SIMBA

Mobile broadband providers:

- MNOs:
  - Singtel (includes sub-brands GOMO & hi! by Singtel)
  - StarHub (includes sub-brands giga! and eight Telecom)
  - M1 (includes sub-brand Maxx)
  - SIMBA (previously TPG Singapore)
- MVNOs:
  - Circles.Life (on M1's network)
  - Zero1 (on Singtel's network)
  - MyRepublic (on StarHub's 5G network and M1's 4G network)
  - VIVIFI (on Singtel's network)
  - CMLink SG (on Singtel's network)
  - Zym Mobile (on Singtel's network)
  - CUniq SG (on StarHub's network)
