= Singapore Network Information Centre =

Logo of the organisation

Singapore Network Information Centre (SGNIC) is the national Internet registry for Singapore. It administers the .sg top level domain.

Formed in October 1995, the SGNIC took over the operation of Domain Name Registration (DNR) Services in November 1995. It operated under the National Computer Board until July 1997 when SGNIC was registered as a company.

Until the formation of SGNIC, Singaporean IP numbers were requested through Technet or SingNet. Plans to establish SGNIC began in early 1995.

The SGNIC comprises four entities:

- SGNIC Board
- SGNIC Operations
- Domain Name Registration Service (DNRS) Committee
- Domain Name System Technical (DNST) Committee

The SGNIC board formulates policies for SGNIC and comprises representatives from regulatory and commercial agencies in Singapore.

== Domain names ==
As of August 2014, there were 165,579 domain names registered at SGNIC, under the following categories:

- .sg - 65,151
- .com.sg - 94,917
- .net.sg - 237
- .org.sg - 2,818
- .edu.sg - 1,143
- .gov.sg - 667
- .per.sg - 415
- .新加坡 - 216
- .சிங்கப்பூர் - 15
