= Maverickeye =

German copyright enforcement company

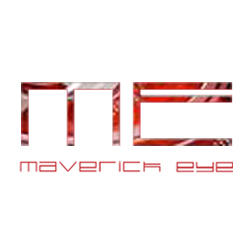
- Trade name: Maverickeye
- Type: Public
- Industry: Copyright
- Founded: Germany, 2012
- Headquarters: Stuttgart, Germany
- Area served: United States of America; United Kingdom; Singapore; Denmark
- Services: Copyright infringement detection
- Website: www.maverickeye.de

Maverickeye UG (or Maverickeye) is a copyright enforcement company that is based in Germany. It detects and retraces copyright infringement using software technology.

== Etymology ==
Maverickeye comes from two words: maverick, which means “unorthodox or independent-minded” and eye. Combined, the whole name refers to the company's unconventional way of detecting copyright violators.

== Services ==
Maverickeye provides surveillance of intellectual property within various peer-to-peer (P2P) networks such as BitTorrent and eMule. It makes use of hardware infrastructure to identify, analyse, archive, and document the illegal distribution of copyrighted materials. Maverickeye generates analytical, statistical, and graphical reports for P2P downloads of Internet users. They also offer takedown services requesting removal of unlicensed content from search engines and torrent sites. This service includes an analysis and trademark and picture infringement detection.

== Takedown process ==
1. Identify the sites that contain infringed content.
2. Conduct human verification.
3. Send takedown notices to suspected sites.
4. Monitor the sites’ compliance.
5. Manage documentation reports for clients.

== Recent cases ==
United States of America

A lawsuit was directed at 11 users of the Popcorn Time software. Popcorn Time is a free alternative to subscription-based video streaming services such as Amazon Video and Netflix.

In September 2015, one of Maverickeye's lawyers filed a lawsuit against 16 infringers using Maverickeye's data to prove that infringers collaborated over Popcorn Time.

In Glacier Films v. Doe 3:15-cv-02016, the same partner lawyer was able to “see through dynamic IP addresses”. (Source: Rational Rights)

In total, Maverickeye was able to deliver data for over 200 federal cases and never lost one case.

United Kingdom

The company reached out to BAFTA, UK Film Council, Lord Lucas, Lord Clement-Jones, FACT and many others to explain and talk about the reduction of Internet copyright infringement by 30% in Germany. However, the idea of making the subscriber liable for infringements which has been adapted in other jurisdictions was met by disapproval by all of the politicians and government bodies who insisted that the DEA would solve all the problems.

After three years, Maverickeye finally received their first court order in the beginning of 2015, and sent out the first batch of letters in July 2015.

Singapore

Maverickeye identified more than 500 Singapore Internet Protocol (IP) addresses — of Singtel, StarHub and M1 Limited subscribers — at which the movie Dallas Buyers Club was allegedly downloaded.

Denmark

Dallas Buyers Club (DBC) also demanded fines for legal damages from Popcorn Time users in Denmark at the end of 2014. In summer this year, DBC's copyright owner filed mass lawsuits against those who have allegedly downloaded the movie through BitTorrent.
