= Wireless@SG =

Wireless broadband programme

- Country: Singapore
- Availability: Singapore
- Official website: SingNet Official Website

Wireless@SG is a wireless broadband programme developed by the Infocomm Development Authority (IDA) of Singapore as part of its Next Generation National Infocomm Infrastructure initiative, being part of the nation's 10-year masterplan called Intelligent Nation 2015 (iN2015).

The targeted users of this wireless broadband network are broadly classified as "people on the move" – people who require wireless broadband access while away from their homes, schools and offices. These include students, tourists, business travellers and enterprise users such as insurance agents and real estate agents who use widely available and wireless-enabled devices such as notebook PCs and PDAs. Once connected, users will be able to access all Internet-based services, including online gaming, web surfing, instant messaging, VoIP and email.

== History ==
The IDA issued a Call-for-Collaboration (CFC) early 2006 for interested operators to provide such coverage. Late 2006, IDA has accepted the proposals from iCELL Network, QMAX Communications and SingTel, to kick-start the nation's progressive deployment of a widely available wireless network by September 2007.

Following the announcement on 10 October 2006 by Prime Minister Lee Hsien Loong, that Singapore will get to enjoy two years of free wireless broadband connections from January next year. IDA announced on 30 November 2006 that the three Wireless@SG operators have extended this free offering to three years. Users started to enjoy wireless connectivity from 1 December 2006, one month ahead of schedule at selected hotspots.

On 31 May 2007, Network deployment for all Primary Catchment Areas in all Regions was completed with the Secondary Catchment Areas in all Regions was completed on 30 September 2007.

The CFC on Wireless Broadband Market Development was scheduled to be completed on 31 December 2008. It has two main objectives of:

- Accelerating the deployment of wireless broadband by providing coverage in locations where users out of their homes, schools and offices can conveniently access wireless broadband services using data-centric computing devices.
- Catalysing the demand for wireless broadband services by increasing the number of wireless broadband users.

On 16 June 2009, the government announced an extension of the programme until March 2013 and enhancement of speed up to 1 Mbit/s. Access speeds were increased to 1 Mbit/s in 2008, and 2 Mbit/s in 2009.

In September 2009, M1 Limited acquired local connectivity provider, Qala Singapore, taking over QMax's Wireless@SG service.

Funding from IDA has stopped since April 2013 for the "deployment and operations costs of Wireless@SG" hot spots. It was reported the main newspaper that the number of hotspots had dipped. Some malls will be left without the free WIFI hotspots.

On 1 April 2013, StarHub and Y5Zone were added to the list of Wireless@SG operators, while iCELL was dropped as the company's proposal did not meet IDA's requirements for the next deployment phase of the programme and will remain support until 30 June 2013.

On 11 April 2016, Parliament announced that the surfing speeds of Wireless@SG will be increased to 5 Mbit/s, up from 2 Mbit/s. The number of hotspots will also double to 20,000.

== Operators ==
=== Current ===
- Singtel
- M1
- StarHub
- MyRepublic

=== Previous ===
- QMAX
- iCELL
- Y5Zone

== Coverage ==
To access Wireless@SG, users need to be located within the respective Wireless@SG coverage areas. The list of hotspots include shopping centres, libraries, museums, public swimming pools, cafes, restaurants, fast food joints and other public venues. The latest coverage areas can be found at Google Earth and at the IDA portal.

== Accessing the network ==
To connect to the Wireless@SG wireless broadband network, a user just needs a WiFi-enabled device (such as a laptop, mobile phone, or tablet), and a mobile number. With this registered account, the user is able to roam within any of Wireless@SG's coverage areas, regardless of the operators' network. Available login methods include: SIM-based authentication (EAP-SIM), Seamless and Secure Access (PEAP with EAP-MSCHAPv2), and HTTP-based login (Captive portal).

Users are encouraged by the IDA to install and activate a Virtual Private Network (VPN) or other encryption mechanism, Personal firewall; and Anti-virus software with the latest signature files. The IDA also encourages users to avoid ad hoc wireless networking to safeguard their security.

There are various ways users can register for this service:

- HTTP-based manual login with mobile number: Locals and foreign visitors can access Wireless@SG by entering their mobile number on the sign-in page. A One-Time Password (OTP) will be sent to them via SMS.
- Seamless and Secure Access (SSA) automatic login: Users can configure their device to connect to the Wireless@SGx network automatically, as opposed to generating a One-Time Password via SMS every time on the Wireless@SG network. EAP-SIM authentication is available for devices with a SIM card. The Wireless@SG app is available on Windows, Mac, Android, and iOS, for devices without a SIM card. It sets up an 802.1X profile with PEAP authentication, after users provide a Singapore NRIC/FIN and a mobile number.
