= Facilities on the Mass Rapid Transit (Singapore) =

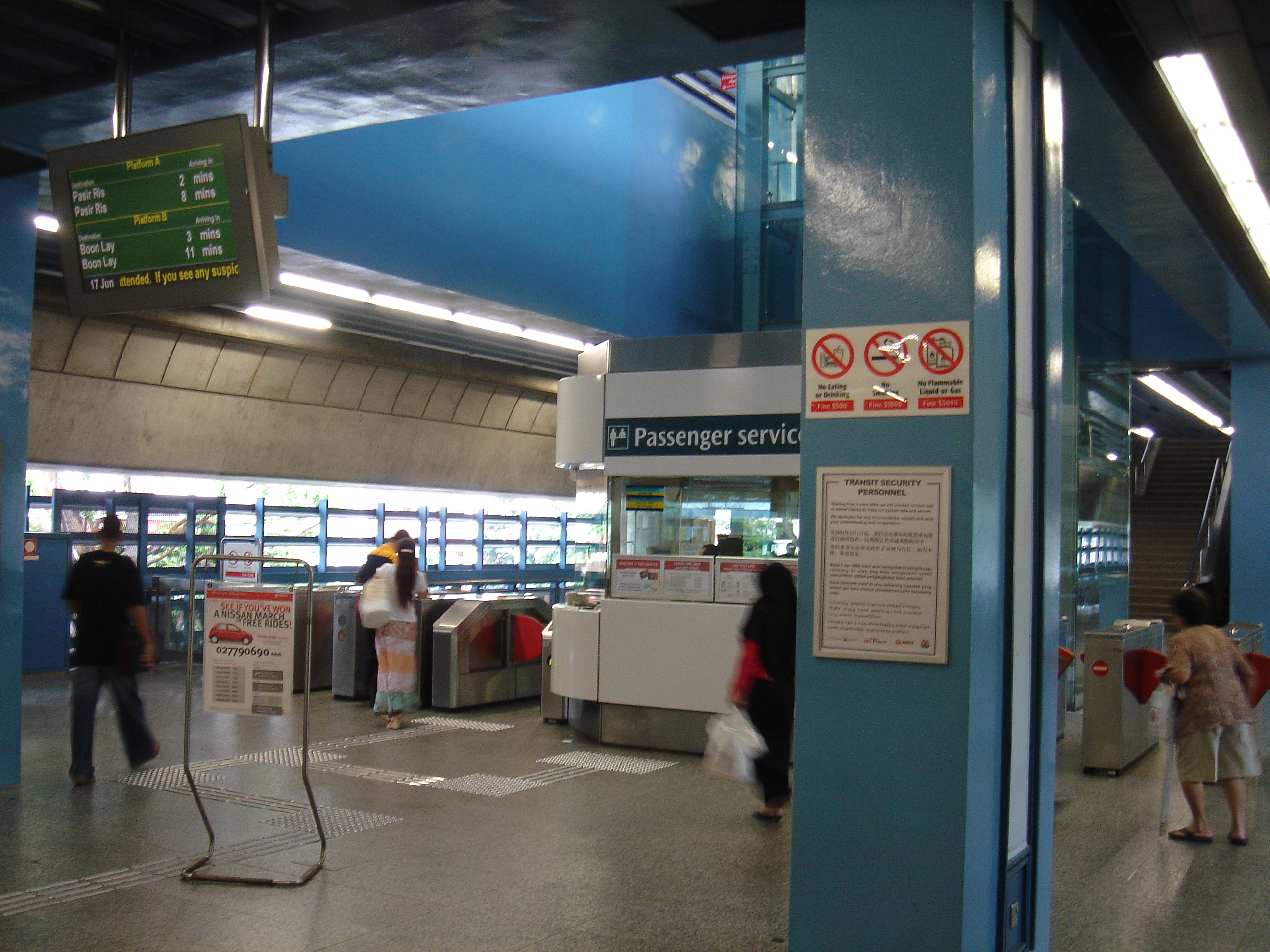
Concourse level of Queenstown Station, showing a Conrac plasma display, passenger service centre, and faregates

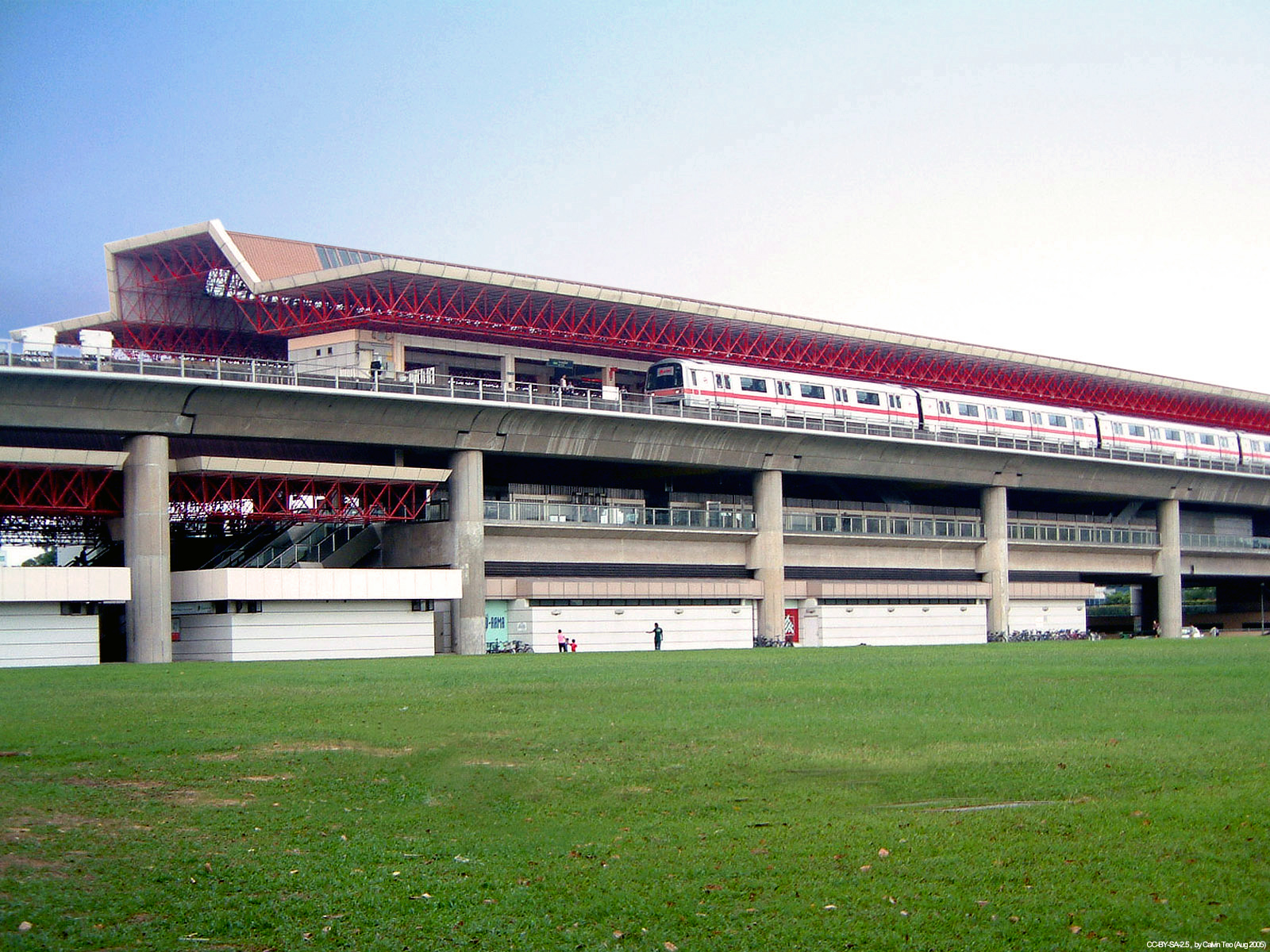
Exterior view of Jurong East station, showing a C151 Train approaching

Some MRT stations, particularly interchange stations, are deep enough to be shielded from conventional bomb attacks from the air and act as bomb shelters. This status is enhanced by the fact that underground MRT systems have prebuilt ventilation systems with air-conditioning to ensure a degree of comfort in the unlikely event of a conventional air assault.

Most stations have island platforms, although a few possess side platforms. This is because island platforms are seen to be less costly than side platforms, or possibly to make it convenient for passengers to transfer to another train on the same line but running in the opposite direction. Also, all stations are made to be as straight as possible because the degree that trains would turn at when approaching and leaving a station would be too great if curved stations were built.

Otis was awarded to supply elevators and escalators for the MRT project in 1984, which includes 42 freight elevators and 236 escalators. These elevators are only used for MRT staff to bring fare collection trolleys to the money train. Elevators were off-limits to all commuters and there was no technology used for wheelchair-accessibility. A few surviving elevators of these kind were found at Orchard, Somerset, Simei, Tampines, Pasir Ris, Bedok, Kembangan, and Eunos. Planning for the elevators that are accessible to the public began in 1995, and the process involves doing away freight elevators. Public elevators were introduced at Expo MRT Station in the year 2000, and upgraded to all MRT stations by 2005.

SPH Media Trust's The New Paper was distributed at most stations every weekday morning and Saturdays from 1 December 2016 to 10 December 2021. Wireless@SG, Singapore's free Wi-Fi network, has been deployed at all station platforms. Buskers were deployed to various crowded MRT stations in order to ease overcrowding on the MRT, which has been started at City Hall and Raffles Place during the mornings. Escalator announcements were also put up in Simei and Tanjong Pagar, and charging points were put up at City Hall and Kent Ridge.
