= ICELL Network =

Singapore wireless infrastructure provider

iCELL Network Pte Ltd
- Company type: Private
- Industry: Wireless infrastructure; Data management
- Founded: January 2004
- Headquarters: Singapore
- Key people: Ken Chua (CEO as of 2013)

iCELL Network Pte Ltd was a Singapore-based wireless infrastructure provider. It was, at one time in the 2000s, one of the three operators of the Wireless@SG programme in Singapore.

== History ==
The company was formed in 2004, spun off from PC-Connect, a company focusing on systems' integration, which, in turn, was spun off from Neat Technologies in 2002.

The Infocomm Development Authority of Singapore (IDA) selected iCELL to be one of the three initial service providers for Wireless@SG. iCELL was eventually dropped from the programme in July 2013, when the company's proposal did not meet IDA's requirements for the next deployment phase of the programme.

In 2015, Chua Thiong Kien was sentenced to six months imprisonment for cheating the Infocommunications Development Authority of Singapore. While iCELL was part of the Wireless@SG project, Chua submitted an expense of $379,200 to the IDA, the authority over Wireless@SG; included in the expenses was an invoice for 425 Internet cameras from PC Connect. In reality, only 44 cameras were actually purchased; Chua himself was still a director at PC Connect and had directed PC Connect to create the invoice for 425 cameras.
