= Technet =

Technet may refer to:

- Technet (comics), a fictional group in the Marvel Comics universe
- TechNet (computer network), Singapore's first Internet access provider
- Microsoft TechNet, a former resource for IT professionals

== See also ==
- Technetium (symbol Tc), a chemical element with atomic number 43
