= Simba Telecom =

Singaporean telecommunications company

- Type: Private
- Traded as: ASX: TUA
- Industry: Telecommunications
- Founded: 1 July 2016; 10 years ago
- Headquarters: 1 Kaki Bukit View, Techview, Singapore 415941
- Area served: Singapore
- Key people: David Teoh (Executive Chairman); Richard Tan (Chief Executive Officer)
- Products: Mobile Services; Fibre Broadband
- Revenue: S$117.1 million (Sept 2024)
- Number of employees: Approx. 100
- Website: Official website

SIMBA Telecom Pte Ltd, formerly known as TPG Singapore, is a Singaporean telecommunications company and one of four major telecommunication companies operating in the country.

TPG Singapore was founded in 2016 by Australian businessman David Teoh after winning an auction from Infocomm Media Development Authority (IMDA) for its airwaves rights. It was a subsidiary of TPG Telecom Australia, an Australian telecommunications company founded by Teoh.

In 2020, the merger of TPG Australia with Vodafone Hutchison Australia to form TPG Telecom resulted in TPG Singapore splitting up from its Australian counterpart. As a result, TPG Singapore operated under the newly established and Australian-listed Tuas Ltd, also founded by Teoh, independently of the merged TPG Telecom entity. In 2022, TPG Singapore was rebranded to SIMBA Telecom after the usage rights to TPG brand expired.

== History ==
=== 2016–2019: Founding as TPG Singapore ===
On 14 December 2016, it was announced that TPG had secured the fourth telecommunications license in Singapore for S$105 million (A$122 million). The reserve price was only S$35 million, and TPG Singapore paid three times the minimum that was asked for by the Singapore authorities.

They were provisionally allocated 60 MHz of spectrum made available in the New Entrant Spectrum Auction (NESA), with spectrum rights that commenced in April 2017. TPG was also expected to provide street level coverage nationwide within 18 months of the start date.

On 21 December 2018, a call for 20,000 participants in a year-long trial was put out, with another call for participants made in March 2019 while delaying the launch of the network to 2020.

For voice communications, it makes use of Voice over LTE technology which saw subscribers have initial troubles setting up during the trial rollout at the start of 2019 as existing phones did not contain the configuration profile required for the VoLTE functionality to work. These was largely resolved when the major brands added the configuration profile into their operating systems, with Apple adding the profile only in September 2019.

In July 2019, a study by Opensignal found that TPG Singapore had slower network speeds and poorer connectivity than the established rival telcos.

=== 2020 – 2021: Commercial service ===
TPG launched commercial service in March 2020.

Tuas Limited was incorporated in Australia on 11 March 2020 in anticipation of the demerger of the Singapore operations of TPG Telecom Limited (subsequently renamed to TPG Corporation Limited) resulting from the merger between TPG Telecom and Vodafone Hutchison Australia. That merger attained final court approval on 26 June 2020 with the demerger of TPG Singapore becoming effective and under whose terms Tuas Limited has the rights to use the TPG brand in Singapore until June 2022.

In November 2021, IMDA announced that the telco has won the rights to the 2.1 GHz spectrum of 5G network and services and is provisionally awarded two lots of 5 MHz of the spectrum. With accordance to IMDA, TPG Singapore would have the right to provide 5G network services, starting 1 January 2022. As part of the regulatory process, TPG Singapore has to roll out the 5G network islandwide by the end of 2026.

=== 2022 – 2025: Rebrand to SIMBA ===
In April 2022, TPG Singapore was required to change its branding following the expiration of its two-year usage rights for the TPG name and was subsequently rebranded as SIMBA Telecom.

In March 2023, Simba submitted a response to the IMDA Consultation Paper on the proposed allocation of the 6 GHz band. In its submission, Simba expressed views on spectrum allocation for mobile telecommunications, advocating for a technology-neutral approach and a balanced approach to foster innovation and competition in the market.

In the same month, it was announced that Simba will be entering the internet service provider (ISP) market in Singapore, offering the first 2.5Gbit/s broadband service. It will be leveraging the existing network infrastructure in Singapore. Subsequently, Simba upgraded its broadband offerings to 10 Gbit/s following a government initiative that provided subsidies of up to $100 million to local broadband operators.

In September 2023, all Simba 4G plans has been upgraded to support 5G.

As of 2025, Simba has 11% of the local market share.

=== 2025 – present: Controversies ===
On 11 August 2025, Keppel announced it will sell its 83.9 per cent effective stake in M1 to Simba. While Simba will acquire the telecommunication portion of M1, Keppel will retain M1's enterprise business. The sale requires Infocomm Media Development Authority (IMDA)'s approval. On 18 May 2026, IMDA suspended its assessment after discovering a potential regulatory breach. Later that day, Keppel announced that it would allow the deal to lapse on its 21 May deadline.

On October 26, 2026, in a filing to the Australian Securities Exchange (ASX), Tuas said the IMDA had issued Simba a notice to show cause, setting out six allegations involving unauthorised spectrum use, breaches of telecommunications regulations and concerns about the company's governance and compliance practices, which could be subjected to a fine and have its licenses suspended or revoked. On November 16, Simba admitted the non-compliance and chose not to contest unauthorized spectrum usage for three breaches (2100 MHz band spectrum for 4G, 2340-2360 MHz band spectrum, and 5G Indoor radio access network equipment), and announced the resignation of chairman Richard Tan, pending on the approval of regulators.

== Network ==
Frequencies used on SIMBA Network in Singapore
Band	Frequency	Frequency Width (MHz)	Protocol	Notes
8 (900 MHz)	(895~905; 940~950)	2x10	LTE	
1 (2100 MHz)	(1920~1930; 2110~2120)	2x10	5G NR	
40 (2.3 GHz)	2300~2340	40	LTE	
38 (2600 MHz)	2570~2580	10	LTE	
