= .sg =

Internet country-code top level domain for Singapore

- Introduced: 19 October 1988
- TLD type: Country code top-level domain
- Status: Active
- Registry: SGNIC
- Sponsor: SGNIC
- Intended use: Entities connected with Singapore
- Registered domains: 202,905 (June 2025)
- Registration restrictions: Singapore presence required; third-level names have various restrictions depending on which second level label they are under
- Structure: Registrations are taken at the third level beneath generic categories, or directly at the second level; special .idn.sg category exists for internationalized domain names
- Documents: Policies and agreements
- Dispute policies: Singapore Domain Name Dispute Resolution Policy
- Registry website: sgnic.sg

.sg is the Internet country code top-level domain (ccTLD) for Singapore. It was first registered in September 1988. It is administered by the Singapore Network Information Centre (SGNIC). Registrations are processed via accredited registrars.

In 2011, two new internationalized country code top-level domains were registered for Singapore, intended for domain names in the local languages. These domains are .新加坡 (encoded as .xn--yfro4i67o) for Chinese websites, and .சிங்கப்பூர் (encoded as .xn--clchc0ea0b2g2a9gcd), for Tamil websites.

== Restrictions ==
SGNIC requires that all .sg domains registered after 2 May 2013 have proof of Singaporean presence. This is facilitated by requiring the registrant to login to the Verified@SG portal with their SingPass account.

== Second-level domains ==
- .com.sg – Commercial entities
- .net.sg – Network providers and info-com operators
- .org.sg – Organizations in the Registry of Societies
- .gov.sg – Government entities
- .edu.sg – Educational institutions
- .per.sg – Personal domain names (retired as of March 2023)
- .sg – Open to all with a valid Singapore postal address

== .sg domain statistics ==
As of June 2025, there were 202,905 registered .sg domains.
