= David Teoh =

Australian businessman (born 1955)

- Born: 1955 (age 70–71); British Malaya
- Occupations: Executive Chairman & CEO
- Known for: Founder, TPG and Simba Telecom
- Spouse: Vicky Teoh
- Children: 4

David Siang Hai Teoh is an Australian businessman. Until March 26, 2021, he was the executive chairman of TPG, a company he founded with his Taiwanese wife Vicky in 1992 after emigrating from Malaysia in 1986. He is also the founder and executive chairman of Tuas Limited, who owns Simba Telecom, a telecommunications company in Singapore.

== Biography ==
TPG started off as a computer retail company, but several acquisitions including the purchase of a mobile spectrum licence, have contributed to its success as a major internet service provider.

In August 2018, Teoh announced TPG was in discussions with Vodafone Hutchinson Australia about a proposed $13 billion merger. Teoh's only comment about the proposed merger was that the pricing would be “very aggressive” and that it would bring value to the customer. It was blocked by the Australian Competition & Consumer Commission on the grounds that it would lessen consumer choice in both the internet and mobile phone markets. In early 2020 Vodafone and TPG were granted permission by the Federal Court to merge, paving the way for the stalled $15 billion deal to finally proceed.

== Personal life ==
Reclusive, Teoh has only been photographed in public twice. A photographer staked out his house for three days in 2015, and in 2019 the proposed merger with Vodafone obliged him to attend court.

His four sons, Shane, Jack, John and Bob, have launched more than a dozen startup companies dealing in clothing, furniture, technology, and eyeglasses. In 2016 it was reported that his wife, Vicky, had substantial investments, including Vita Life Sciences Ltd, a pharmaceutical and healthcare company.

=== Net worth ===
According to Forbes magazine, in 2019 Teoh was the 25th-richest person in Australia, estimated to have a net worth of approximately US$1.62 billion. As of May 2025, the net worth of Teoh and his wife was assessed in the Australian Financial Review Rich List at A$2.78 billion.

| Year | Financial Review Rich List | | Forbes Australia's 50 Richest | |
| Year | Rank | Net worth (A$) | Rank | Net worth (US$) |
|---|---|---|---|---|
| 2013 | | | 29 ▲ | $0.91 billion ▲ |
| 2014 | | | 17 ▲ | $1.50 billion ▲ |
| 2015 | | | 17 | $1.60 billion ▲ |
| 2016 | | | 9 ▲ | $1.95 billion ▲ |
| 2017 | | $1.91 billion | 29 ▼ | |
| 2018 | 38 ▲ | $1.76 billion ▼ | | |
| 2019 | 38 | $2.03 billion ▲ | 25 ▲ | $1.62 billion ▲ |
| 2020 | 32 ▲ | $2.54 billion ▲ | | |
| 2021 | 40 ▼ | $2.55 billion ▲ | | |
| 2022 | 43 ▼ | $2.60 billion ▲ | | |
| 2023 | 82 ▼ | $1.70 billion ▼ | | |
| 2024 | 56 ▲ | $2.55 billion ▲ | | |
| 2025 | 56 | $2.78 billion ▲ | | |

Legend
| Icon | Description |
|---|---|
| Steady | Has not changed from the previous year |
| ▲ | Has increased from the previous year |
| ▼ | Has decreased from the previous year |
