= Intelligent Nation 2015 =

Intelligent Nation 2015 (iN2015) was a 10-year master plan created in May 2005 by the Government of Singapore to improve Singapore's infocomm infrastructure over the following decade. Led by the Infocomm Development Authority of Singapore (IDA), iN2015 involved several organizations.

According to IDA, iN2015 was the blueprint to navigate Singapore's "transition into a global city, universally recognized as an enviable synthesis of technology, infrastructure, enterprise and manpower".

The Singapore government hoped to use iN2015 to greatly expand Singapore's infocomm industry.

== Purpose ==
The vision of iN2015 is: Singapore: an Intelligent Nation, a Global City, powered By Infocomm.

The goals of the program are as follows:

- To be the first in the world in harnessing infocomm to add value to the economy and society.
- To realize a 2–fold increase in the value-add of the infocomm industry to $26 billion.
- To realize a 3–fold increase in infocomm export revenue to S$60 billion.
- To create 80,000 additional jobs.
- To achieve 90% home broadband usage.
- To achieve 100% computer ownership in homes with school-going children.

=== An integrated government ===
Citizens can expect more proactive, user-friendly, responsive and integrated Government services even on the move. They can provide feedback and exchange views with the Government on public policies and initiatives from anywhere, at any time. This will further enhance the Government's capacity from the synergy that comes with shared services and common application platforms.

Using infocomm as a catalyst, public agencies will work with the private sector to lead infocomm projects that give businesses in Singapore a competitive edge. Citizens will have access to integrated e-services and information online, becoming stakeholders in public policy formulation.

=== Learning ===
Infocomm will empower individuals to learn at one's own pace, place, and time. Learning will take place in environments that provide the best context, be It at the zoo, museums, or outside the classroom.

Beyond textbooks, students, and teachers will have access to interactive digital learning resources. Outside the school, teachers can monitor the progress of learners through new assessment modes and form virtual communities to learn from and collaborate with others within and outside Singapore. Education will engage students and meet the diverse needs of each individual.

=== Healthcare ===
Infocomm will link hospitals, clinics, nursing homes and laboratories with patients' homes, enabling healthcare professionals to access comprehensive patient information instantly.

It will develop the infrastructure that will transform biomedical research into healthcare delivery and empower individuals, giving them more control of their health through access to personal healthcare records and relevant healthcare information.

An integrated healthcare delivery system is planned to give individuals the ability to better manage their health and access higher quality clinical care. It will provide cost-effective healthcare, better service and support strong clinical research.

=== Economic components ===
The initiative seeks to make Singapore a wealth management centre, with intelligent data management and analysis, authenticated and efficient back-office processes, privacy, information systems and security.

A corporate financial information exchange will provide automated reporting, corporate transparency and greater analytical coverage. Next-generation infrastructure will enable nationwide electronic and mobile payments, offering new transactional and value-added services and new e-payment solutions.

Infocomm will augment high value-added activities such as research and product development. It will help develop new manufacturing services business models, reduce time to markets and support one platform for national trade information and transactions.

According to the initiative's plans, the infocomm infrastructure is intended to support logistics infrastructure, supply chain management, manufacturing capabilities, and a national platform for trade information exchange in Singapore.

== Strategies ==
The initiative aims to build a high-speed, secure information and communications network. This includes expanding the Wireless@SG network to 5,000 wireless access points to give citizens internet access across the country. Because human resources are Singapore's primary asset, a major goal of the program is to train the local workforce in technology and grow a globally competitive digital industry.

== Opportunities ==
The IDA hopes that the iN2015 will help create many opportunities in the infocomm industry of Singapore. In the iN2015 website, it is hoped that it will be "transforming lives & businesses", "fueling competitive enterprise", "providing the infrastructure" and "developing human capital".

=== Infrastructure ===
The master plan details how wired and wireless infrastructure will be developed, starting with Wireless@SG, with the aim of making it ultra-high speed, pervasive and intelligent.
