= Pacnet =

Global telecommunications provider

Pacnet Limited
- Type: Private
- Industry: Telecommunications
- Founded: Asia Pacific (2008)
- Fate: acquired by Telstra in 2015
- Headquarters: Hong Kong, Singapore
- Key people: Carl J. Grivner, CEO; Brett Lay, CFO; Andy Lumsden, CTO
- Products: Broadband Internet, Fixed Network, Data Centers
- Owner: Telstra
- Number of employees: >1,400
- Parent: Telstra
- Website: www.telstraglobal.com

Pacnet was a global telecommunications service provider between 2008 and 2015. It was formed from the operational merger of Asia Netcom and Pacific Internet on 8 January 2008. It was owned by a private investor group comprising Ashmore Investment Management Limited, Spinnaker Capital Limited and Clearwater Capital Partners. Its acquisition by the Australian telecommunications company Telstra was announced at the end of 2014, and completed in April 2015.

The company was headquartered in Hong Kong and Singapore, and had offices in Australia, China, India, Indonesia, Japan, South Korea, Malaysia, Netherlands, Philippines, Taiwan, Thailand and United States.

== History ==
=== 1989-2007 ===
==== Asia Netcom ====
In 1999, Global Crossing, Microsoft and Softbank started Asia Global Crossing as a venture to build a US$2 billion cable system, East Asia Crossing (EAC), to connect key Asian markets. In 2000, Asia Global Crossing was listed on NASDAQ, before its listing was moved to NYSE in 2001.

Following the dotcom crash, Asia Global Crossing filed for bankruptcy protection in 2002, and was subsequently delisted from NYSE. To raise additional funding to continue operations, the company sold its assets to a consortium led by China Netcom, Newbridge Capital and Softbank Asia Infrastructure Fund for US$120 million, forming Asia Netcom.

In late 2003, China Netcom acquired 100 percent of Asia Netcom, and the wholly owned subsidiary became part of the China Netcom's public listing on NYSE and SEHK in 2004.

In 2006, China Netcom sold Asia Netcom to Connect Holdings Limited, an investor group consisting of Ashmore Investment Management Limited, Spinnaker Capital Limited and Clearwater Capital Partners, for US$402 million.

In 2007, Asia Netcom's EAC merged with C2C, another submarine cable network owned by Connect Holdings, to form a 36,800 km submarine cable network, EAC-C2C.

==== Pacific Internet ====
Logo of the original Pacific Internet

In 1989, TechNet was started as a research and development computer network for use by academia at the National University of Singapore. Funded by the National Science and Technology Board of Singapore (NSTB), it became Singapore's first Internet Service Provider. In 1995, it was acquired by SembMedia, a division of Singapore conglomerate Sembawang Group, and renamed Pacific Internet Corporation Private Limited. In September the same year, Pacific Internet began its commercial operations in Singapore.

In 1996, Pacific Internet expanded into Hong Kong via an acquisition, increasing its equity stake in the ISP to 100 percent in 1999. In 1997, the company commenced its Philippines operations through a local partner, which was acquired by Pacific Internet a year later.

On 5 February 1999, Pacific Internet launched its initial public offering of shares on NASDAQ at a price of US$17 per share. In the same year, the company started its Australian operations with the acquisition of two ISPs, and launched Pacific Internet India, a joint venture unit of Pacific Internet Limited. In 1999, Pacific Internet acquired Australian Zip World, started in Glebe, Sydney.

In 2000, Pacific Internet expanded into six major cities in Australia through further acquisitions of Australian ISPs. The company also forayed into Thailand, where it made another acquisition and started its Thailand operations. Two years later, Pacific Internet set up operations in Malaysia

In 2007, Pacific Internet was acquired by Connect Holdings, after which, it was delisted from NASDAQ.

On 12 October 2016, the remaining Pacific Internet in Singapore was acquired by CITIC Telecom International Holdings Limited in Hong Kong.

=== 2008: Operational merger and rebranding ===
On 8 January 2008, Asia Netcom and Pacific Internet merged under a new corporate name, Pacnet Limited, and adopted a new logo. The company also completed the acquisition of the remaining shares of Pacific Internet later that year.

=== 2014-18: Acquisition by Telstra, Acclivis ===
It was announced on 23 December 2014 that Pacnet would be acquired by Telstra, Australia's largest telecommunications and media company. Telstra's acquisition of Pacnet was expected to be completed by mid-2015, and includes interests in its China joint venture, Pacnet Business Solutions (PBS), licensed to operate a domestic Internet Protocol Virtual Private Network and provide data centre services in most major provinces in China. Telstra announced the completion of the acquisition in April 2015.

In November 2015 – SGX-Catalist listed DeClout Limited has signed a deal with Pacnet Internet (S) Pte Ltd ("Pacnet Internet Singapore"), a subsidiary of Telstra Corporation Limited ("Telstra"), Australia's leading telecommunications company, to acquire certain Internet Service Provider assets and business in Singapore and Thailand from Pacnet Internet Singapore. Upon the completion of the acquisition, the acquired assets were merged with Acclivis’ existing ISP business, OSINet, and together, rebranded as Pacific Internet, allowing Acclivis to broaden its offerings and achieve further economies of scale in the ISP segment.

In July 2018, Telstra Global is closing Pacnet and migrating users to Telstra's network.

== Submarine communications cable network ==
=== EAC-C2C ===
Pacnet's pan-Asia EAC-C2C network was formed from the integration of the EAC (East Asia Crossing) and CSC systems in 2007. The fibre optic subsea cable network spans 36,800 km between Japan, South Korea, Hong Kong, Taiwan, the Philippines, Singapore and China. It has a design capacity of 17.92 Tbit/s to 30.72 Tbit/s to each of these landing countries. The EAC-C2C network lands at 18 cable landing stations across Asia.

=== EAC Pacific ===
EAC Pacific is part of the US$300 million Unity cable system that has been built with five other global companies including Bharti Airtel, Global Transit, Google, KDDI Corporation and SingTel. Pacnet operates two of the five fibre pairs in the cable system independently.

The two fibre pairs, collectively known as EAC Pacific, provide up to 1.92 Tbit/s of capacity across the Pacific Ocean. At Chikura, EAC Pacific is connected to the EAC-C2C cable system.

The Unity cable system was built by NEC Corporation and Tyco Telecommunications. Construction began in February 2008, and the cable system has been ready for service since 1 April 2010.

== Data centres ==
Pacnet operated 24 data centre sites in the Asia Pacific region.

In 2010, Pacnet started building high-tier data centre capabilities within its cable landing facilities. The company launched its first data center with direct connectivity into its subsea cable infrastructure in Hong Kong on 2 November that year. This was soon followed by the launch of its second data centre with direct connectivity into its subsea cable infrastructure in its Singapore cable landing station later that month.

On 15 February 2011, the company unveiled its Sydney data centre. Located in the central business district of Sydney at 133 Liverpool Street, the Tier III facility has 5,920 square feet (550 square meters) of space over three levels in an existing, occupied building. It was built by FDC Construction & Fitout Pty. Ltd. in six months, and won the prestigious Masters Builders Association Excellence in Construction Award in 2011.

On 22 March 2012, Pacnet opened its fourth advanced data centre in the Tseung Kwan O Industrial Estate, Hong Kong.

On 5 December 2012, Pacnet signed an agreement with the Tianjin Wuqing government to jointly develop a data centre in Tianjin Wuqing Business District in Tianjin, China. The facility - estimated to cost RMB450 million (US$72 million) to build - was Pacnet's fifth data centre in China and one of its largest data centres. Construction commenced in early 2013 and the data centre was expected to be operational in early 2014.

== Other facilities ==
=== Network operations centres ===
Pacnet ran two NOCs, in Singapore and Sydney. These two NOCs ran 24 × 7 operations and had the capabilities to operate as a backup NOC in the event that the systems in one NOC lost network visibility.
