= Singapore ONE =

Defunct Singaporean broadband network

Singapore ONE (The Singapore One Network for Everyone) was a broadband network that existed in Singapore in the 1990s and early 2000s.

== History ==
A precursor was created in December 1994 as a S$3 million project by the National Computer Board to research the Asynchronous Transfer Mode protocol.

The network was announced in June 1996 and included high-speed internet access, videoconferencing, shopping, entertainment and electronic libraries, with its completion expected for 1998. It had a higher capacity than Singapore Telecom's already-existing Teleview service. The government announced a plan to increase its penetration with the creation of the Internetwork Hub (I-Hub), created from the integration of the existing information networks in the country. The founding agreement was formalised on 24 September with the entry of Singapore CableVision, Singapore Telecom and the Telecommunications Authority of Singapore as partners, receiving SG$20 million each for a two-year period. The TAS would later cut its 40% share once the network was in full swing. Two ISPs joined in late October.

Fifteen companies had shown support for the project in November 1996, setting up websites for a pilot project with SCV. These were:

- Abacus (travel)
- Cable Media Corporation (virtual property tours)
- Chan Brothers (travel and tours)
- CyberMart (bookstores)
- Edge Consultant (Metro's virtual shop)
- F.J. Benjamin (apparels and accessories)
- Golden Village (movie tickets)
- Hour Glass (information retrieval and reservation system)
- Ken Air (travel)
- NTUC Fairprice (groceries)
- NTUC Income (insurance)
- OUB (finance and banking)
- RCB (music)
- Sembawang Media (arts and entertainment scene)
- Television Corporation of Singapore (MediaCity website)

January 1997 saw fourteen companies investing in the network, at a total cost of SG$100 million. These were:

- Andersen Consulting (e-commerce)
- Bloomberg (business news)
- Electronic Arts (video games)
- Global Knowledge Network (adult education and retraining)
- Hewlett-Packard (multimedia framework)
- IBM (information services)
- Microsoft (leisure and entertainment guide)
- Motorola (interactive services)
- Music Pen (interactive services)
- NEC Singapore (Japanese-targeted applications)
- Oracle (online multimedia training)
- Reuters (news and information)
- Sun Microsystems (multimedia software)
- Yahoo! (creation of an Asian version of its search engine)

The network was now expected to be operational by mid-1998.

Seventeen more companies joined in April, totalling SG$115 million in investments. These were:

- IBM Singapore
- Creative Technology
- Philips Singapore
- IPC Interactive
- Ericsson Radio Systems AB
- Panasonic Singapore Laboratories
- Goldtron Interactive
- National University of Singapore
- Singapore Polytechnic
- Visa International
- JVC Asia
- Allied Telesyn International (Asia)
- Centre for Wireless Communications
- Gemplus Technologies Asia
- Information Technology Institute
- Institute of Systems Science
- Knowledge Engineering

A new service, Virtual Jukebox, was announced in May, developed by four students of the Singapore Polytechnic. First tests were conducted on 9 June. 2,000 people joined the tests; 500 of the users reported successful usage. Forty public kiosks were already installed and the service was set to be operational there from July, while an additional thirty were expected to be installed by the end of the year. The services included Me to You, an interactive chat and game service, Shop and Fun, with twenty sites, Government, with eight sites, including one featuring government videos, Learning, with twenty sites, including Curriculum ALIVE, Online Learning Environment and HistoryCity, set in Singapore in 1870, and Information, with sixteen sites, such as Click Diz and TCS's Mediacity. Supermarket chains Metro and Cold Storage already had websites.
