= ViewQwest =

Internet service provider of Singapore

ViewQwest Pte Ltd
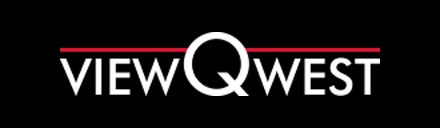
- Type: Private company
- Industry: Telecommunications
- Founded: 2001
- Headquarters: Singapore
- Products: Broadband and fixed line Internet services, IT and network services.
- Website: www.viewqwest.com

ViewQwest is a Singaporean Internet service provider (ISP) that provides fiber broadband services to both businesses and residential users. Established in 2001, ViewQwest initially provided businesses with Internet connectivity. In January 2012, the company entered the residential fiber broadband market following Infocomm Development Authority of Singapore's launch of the Next Generation Nationwide Broadband Network (NGNBN) in 2010.

== History ==
ViewQwest was founded in 2001. In November 2011, it invested S$8m to offer NGNBN to businesses. ViewQwest became the first ISP in Singapore to remove international bandwidth caps in early 2012. In 2016, the company expanded its services to Malaysia by offering fibre broadband Internet with speeds up to 1 Gbit/s through ViewQwest Digital Sdn Bhd.
