= MyRepublic =

Singapore-based Internet company

MyRepublic Limited
- Type: Private
- Industry: Telecommunications
- Founded: July 2011; 15 years ago
- Headquarters: Singapore
- Areas served: Singapore; Indonesia; Platform licensed to operators in Singapore and Brunei
- Key people: Malcolm Rodrigues (CEO, Co-founder); Greg Mittman (CCDO, Co-founder); KC Lai (Co-Founder & Advisor)
- Services: High-speed fibre broadband and internet services; Mobile; Digital television; IT and network services
- Number of employees: Approximately 300
- Website: myrepublic.net

MyRepublic (full name: MyRepublic Group Limited) is a Singaporean communications service provider launched in 2011. The MyRepublic Group Limited group of companies consists of MyRepublic Broadband which offers broadband and cloud services, MyRepublic Limited which offers mobile phone plans, and MyRepublic Digital which offers digital platform services.

As of August 2026 MyRepublic operates solely in Singapore, providing home broadband plans, mobile plans, and business services, but also licenses its platform to operators in Brunei and Indonesia through its joint venture with Sinar Mas.

== History ==
=== 2011-2015 ===
MyRepublic was founded by former vice president of StarHub International and Wholesale, Malcolm Rodrigues, former senior vice president of StarHub Consumer Sales, KC Lai, and former lead of Alcatel-Lucent's National Broadband Network Team, Greg Mittman. The company was established on 25 July 2011; became a licensed telecommunications carrier in Singapore in October 2011; signed the interconnection agreement with the National Broadband Company in Singapore shortly after; held a soft launch in mid-December 2011; and officially launched its operations in Singapore on 16 February 2012. Unburdened by costly legacy and with what Rodrigues calls a "thin operator model", by the end of 2012 MyRepublic had 450 resellers, 10,000 subscribers, and had earned more than S$5 million in revenue.

In January 2014 MyRepublic expanded into New Zealand and also launched its 1 Gbit/s service in Singapore. In May 2014 the company received an investment of S$4.4 million from Indonesian energy company Dian Swastatika Sentosa, part of the Indonesian conglomerate Sinar Mas, and in July of that year it received a further S$20 million investment from Sunshine Network, a telecommunications arm of Sinar Mas, as well as a S$10 million investment from Xavier Niel, founder of French telecommunications company Free. That same year MyRepublic announced its interest in being Singapore's 4th telco after Singtel, StarHub, and M1, promising to introduce unlimited mobile data plans.

In April 2015 MyRepublic announced plans to participate in a mobility trial in Jurong Lake District, Singapore as part of the Government's trial of HetNet ("heterogeneous network"). HetNet was a new wireless system that leveraged NBN as part of a mobile network, allowing mobile phone users to hop across networks to minimise surfing slowdowns or disruptions automatically. As part of the trial, MyRepublic gave out 1,000 free SIM cards with unlimited 4G data to trial participants in the coverage area of malls, public housing blocks, bus interchanges, and MRT train stations.

In September 2015 the company submitted its bid for the New Entrant Spectrum Auction (NESA), along with Australian telco TPG Telecom and Singapore start-up airYotta. Of the three, only MyRepublic and TPG were pre-qualified to participate in the NESA. MyRepublic ultimately exited the auction at S$102.5 million, ceding the license to TPG and citing concerns that bidding higher would not make sense for its business case.

In July 2015 MyRepublic expanded its operations to an initial nine locations in Indonesia, and in August announced plans to expand and launch its services in Australia. In September 2015 the company raised S$23 million in new capital, including a major investment from Brunei telecommunications provider DST.

=== 2016-17 ===
In March 2016 MyRepublic launched a self-service plug-and-play wide-area-network (WAN) service for businesses, and in November officially launched its operations in Australia. In July 2017 it officially connected Wollongong, New South Wales to consumer-grade NBN 1 Gbit/s connections, the first town in Australia to have this service.

In May 2017 reports emerged that MyRepublic was looking for private equity backing to bid for Singaporean telecommunications company M1. This would allow the company to get back into the Singapore telco market despite not winning the fourth telco license. In a press conference later that year MyRepublic confirmed the report but added that it was no longer interested in buying M1 and would seek to offer mobile services as a Mobile Virtual Network Operator (MVNO) instead.

In September 2017 MyRepublic was named one of the 2017 winners of the Red Hat Innovation Awards APAC for Singapore, for its outstanding and innovative use of Red Hat solutions.

=== 2018-2019 ===
In February 2018 MyRepublic was ranked #64 on the Financial Times' inaugural List of the Top 1000 fastest-growing companies in the Asia-Pacific, and in May the company launched MyRepublic Connected Business, a streamlined networking solution in partnership with Cisco Meraki. It also announced its MVNO partnership with StarHub that month, enabling it to offer services using StarHub's mobile infrastructure. In June 2018 MyRepublic announced a new investment of US$60m from CLSA Capital Partners, the asset management business of CLSA capital markets and investment group and Kamet Capital Partners, a Singapore family office.

In September 2019 Brunei's largest mobile operator, DST, selected MyRepublic as its partner to manage Brunei's telecom infrastructure carveout and DST's transformation to a quad-play thin operator.

=== 2020-2023 ===
In February 2020 MyRepublic Singapore commissioned its first Wi-Fi 6 (AX) managed Wi-Fi network for its enterprise customers, later installing and commissioning a managed Wi-Fi network serving thousands of users in less than 14 days during the COVID-19 Circuit Breaker period of April 2020. In October of that year MyRepublic and M1 Limited (M1) signed an agreement for MyRepublic to deliver an enhanced suite of mobile services as an MVNO using M1's mobile network infrastructure.

In March 2021 MyRepublic launched a rebranding campaign that appeared across MRT stations and digital channels,and in May it launched a self-serve SIM card activation service for new mobile customers. At the same time MyRepublic refreshed its SMB (small and medium business) and enterprise service offerings, including Microsoft 365, Teams, and a cybersecurity suite designed in partnership with IT solutions provider Inspira Enterprise. In September 2021 StarHub acquired the majority interest in MyRepublic's broadband business, bringing its total investment to S$162.8 million, with MyRepublic's other business units remaining fully owned by MyRepublic Group.

In September 2022 MyRepublic Group launched MyRepublic Digital, a platform-as-a-service spin-off company with its flagship product Encore, a cloud-native digital platform. In December 2022 it sold its customer contracts in Australia to Superloop, thereby ceasing to operate in Australia. In July 2023 MyRepublic also exited the New Zealand broadband market, selling its customer contracts to 2degrees. In November 2023 MyRepublic New Zealand rebranded as an MVNO – Rocket Mobile – and started offering mobile plans in New Zealand.

In January 2023 MyRepublic introduced its 5G plan offerings using StarHub's 5G Standalone/4G/3G infrastructure. MyRepublic's 4G plan offerings continued, using M1's 4G/3G infrastructure.

== Operations in Singapore ==
MyRepublic launched in Singapore in 2012 with fibre broadband Internet plans offering speeds of up to 150 Mbit/s and the country's first no-contract term Internet plans. When MyRepublic rolled out its GAMER fibre broadband packages in February 2012 it became Singapore's first Internet service provider to offer fibre broadband plans specifically catered towards gamers, and in May 2015 MyRepublic launched the first-ever 1 Gbit/s no-contract fibre broadband plan in Singapore. Since then it has gone on to offer fibre broadband and voice services to residential customers in Singapore over the country's Next-Generation Nationwide Broadband Network (Next Gen NBN).

According to internet performance analytics company Ookla, MyRepublic was named Singapore's fastest fixed broadband provider in 2021, achieving a Speed Score of 258.01. In February 2024, MyRepublic unveiled its 10Gbit/s home broadband trial offerings for households looking for speedier in-home connectivity, and in September 2024 the company launched its HyperSpeed 10Gbps and GAMER 10Gbps broadband plans as permanent commercial offerings for residential customers in Singapore. In 2025 the company was recognised by Ookla as Asia's Best Fixed Network based on Speedtest Connectivity Score Data. MyRepublic has also received multiple HardwareZone Tech Awards Reader's Choice awards for Best Fibre Broadband Service Provider in Singapore.

MyRepublic also offers fibre broadband, voice, and managed Wi-Fi services to business customers across Singapore. In 2016 it launched MySDN, its first enterprise connectivity service and available to customers in Singapore, Indonesia, and New Zealand. In 2022 the company announced the launch of Ignite, a brand-new suite of ICT applications specialized for small and medium enterprises in Singapore.

== Operations in Indonesia ==
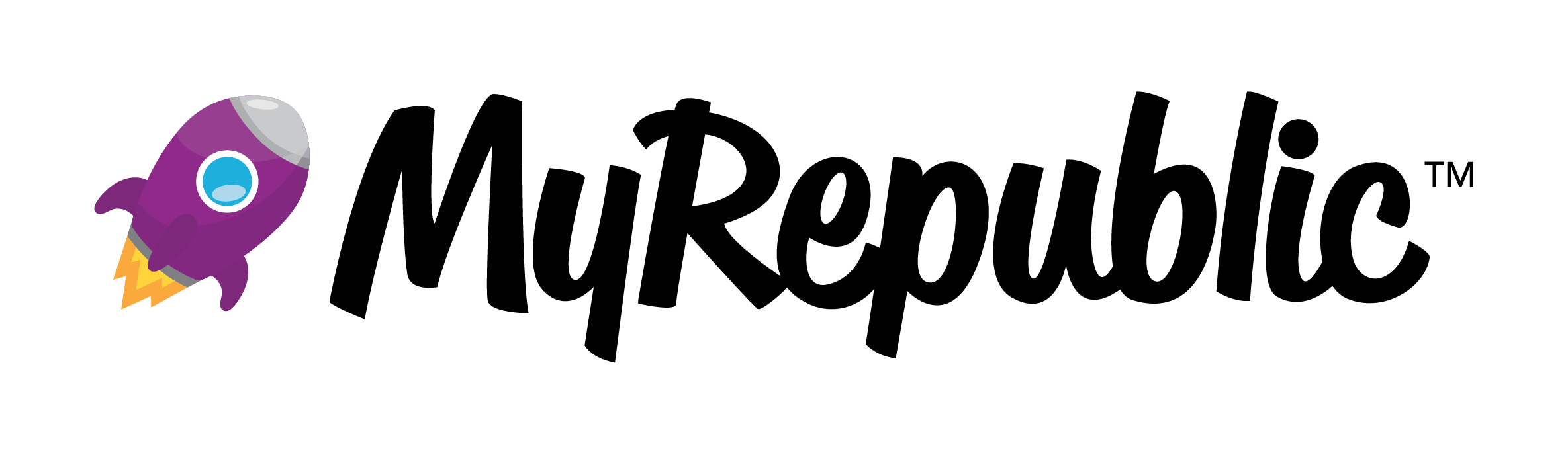
MyRepublic Indonesia's Logo

MyRepublic Indonesia launched operations in Indonesia in April 2015, operating under PT Eka Mas Republik, a subsidiary of PT Dian Swastatika Sentosa Tbk, which is part of Sinar Mas. The initial service covered key urban areas and major cities including Jabodetabek (Jakarta metropolitan area), Semarang, Palembang, Surabaya, Malang, Bogor, Depok, Tangerang, Bekasi, and Palembang.

By utilizing Fiber to the Home (FTTH) technology, MyRepublic Indonesia delivered high-speed, stable, unlimited broadband services without Fair Usage Policy (FUP) restrictions, thereby addressing common pain points for customers such as data caps and speed throttling. Amid the rapid growth of Indonesia's gaming and digital entertainment industry, MyRepublic Indonesia emerged as a preferred internet service provider (ISP) for professional gamers and content creators, with the company actively partnering with esports tournaments, gaming communities, and streaming platforms.

In 2019 MyRepublic Indonesia expanded its services to the city of Bandung, strengthening its presence in West Java, and in 2021 the company formally launched services in Bali, marking its expansion into eastern Indonesia. In 2024 the company strengthened its fiber-optic network infrastructure, integrating AI-driven customer service solutions and introducing new service packages tailored to the evolving digital needs of Indonesian consumers. MyRepublic expanded its coverage outside of Java during 2022 and 2023, significantly enhancing its national footprint, and during 2024 and 2025 the company further expanded its coverage over East Java, West Java, the Riau Islands, Sumatra, Central Java, Kalimantan, and North Sulawesi. As of 2025 the company serves more than 1 million active subscribers and has deployed over 6 million new homepasses, with its services now spanning more than 56 cities and 88 regencies.

== MyRepublic Digital ==
MyRepublic Digital is a subsidiary of MyRepublic that provides enterprise software-as-a-service (SaaS) products and managed services. Originally spun off from the main company to focus on digital transformation for telecommunications operators, the company has since expanded to serve enterprises across multiple industries including banking, healthcare, retail, and government.

The company operates a platform of 12 products including AI-powered chat, conversational voice bots, customer support ticketing, digital IVR, marketing automation, HRMS, survey tools, and a cloud-native BSS/OSS system. It also provides managed services, cybersecurity, cloud transformation, and DevSecOps consulting.

MyRepublic Digital holds ISO 27001 certification for information security management and operates across Singapore, Australia, New Zealand, Indonesia, the Philippines, the United Kingdom, the United States, and India. Its managing director is Wayne Johnson.

== Awards and recognition ==
Year	Awards & Recognition	Provider
2021	Indonesia Popular Brand Digital	Info Brand
2021	Top Innovation Choice Award	Info Brand
2021	Indonesia Brand Champion	Info Brand
2021	Service Quality Diamond Award	Majalah Marketing
2021	Excellence Service Experience Award	Majalah Marketing
2021	Digital Touch Point Customer Engagement Award	Majalah Marketing
2021	Indonesia Wow Brand	Markplus Inc
2021	Indonesia Millennial's Brand Choice Awards	Warta Ekonomi
2021	Indonesia Best Corporate in Pandemic Era	Warta Ekonomi
2022	Indonesia Digital Popular Brand Award	Info Brand
2022	Top Digital Company Award 2022	Majalah Marketing
2022	Excellence Service Experience Award	Majalah Marketing
2022	Digital User Experience Award	Majalah Marketing
2022	Indonesia Most Acclaimed Company Award	Warta Ekonomi
2022	OMNI Brand	Markplus Inc
2022	Indonesia Digital Popular Brand Award	Info Brand
2023	Indonesia Brand Champion 2023	Info Brand
2023	Indonesia Top Digital PR Award 2023	Info Brand
2023	Top Digital Company Award 2023	Marketing
2023	Asian Telecom Award - Infrastructure Initiatives of The Year Indonesia	Asian Telecom
2023	Asian Telecom Award - Cloud Initiatives of The Year Indonesia	Asian Telecom
2023	Indonesia Digital Popular Brand Award	Info Brand
2023	Best Managed Companies Deloitte 2023	Deloitte
2023	Marketeers Editors Choice Award (Internet Product for Gamer of The Year)	Marketeers
2023	IDX Channel Anugerah Inovasi Indonesia 2023 (MyRepublic Infrastructure Innovation)	IDX Channel
2023	Submission Marketing Excellence	Marketing Excellence
2023	Marketing Excellence Awards Indonesia 2023 (Finalist Excellence in Anniversary Marketing for MyRepublic Infin8 Anniversary)	Marketing Excellence
2024	Indonesia Brand Champion 2024	Info Brand
2024	Indonesia Digital Popular Brand Award PLATINUM 2024	Info Brand
2024	Stevie Award Submission	Stevie Award
2024	Asian Telecom Award 2024 - Infrastructure Initiatives of The Year - Indonesia	Asian Telecom
2024	Asian Telecom Award 2024 - Data Management of The Year - Indonesia	Asian Telecom
2024	Ookla Fastest Fixed Network - Indonesia	Ookla
2024	Excellent Service Experience Award	Marketing
2024	Marketeers Omni Brand of The Year 2024	Marketeers
2024	SILVER STEVIE® WINNER: Innovative Achievement in Growth	Stevie Award
2024	SILVER STEVIE® WINNER: Award for Innovation in Technology Management, Planning & Implementation	Stevie Award
2024	BRONZE STEVIE® WINNER: Innovative Achievement in Sales or Revenue Generation	Stevie Award
2024	Indonesia Digital Popular Brand Award 2024	Info Brand
2024	Service Quality Award 2024	Marketing
2024	Indonesia Most Acclaimed Companies (IMACO) Awards 2024	Warta Ekonomi
2024	7 Most Popular Brand of the Year 2024	Jawa Pos
2024	ACES 2025 - Asia's Best Performing Companies	ACES Awards
2024	ACES 2025 - Asia's Most Inspiring Executives	ACES Awards
2025	Infrastructure Initiatives of The Year - Indonesia	Asian Telecom
2025	Broadband of The Year - Indonesia	Asian Telecom
