= TechNet (computer network) =

TechNet Augusta was established in 1991 as a closed research and development computer network for academics at the National University of Singapore (NUS). It was set up by the National Science and Technology Board of Singapore (NSTB), providing Singapore's first Internet access service.

TechNet's international connectivity then was provided by a 128 kbit/s satellite link from JvNCnet.

In March 1995, the Pacific Internet Consortium (SembMedia, ST Computer Systems and SIM) bought TechNet, and commercialised its services in September 1995 when it launched Pacific Internet Corporation Pte Ltd.

TechNet was also responsible for the allocation of IP numbers in Singapore along with Singnet.
