= Infocomm Media Development Authority =

Statutory board of the Singapore government

Agency overview
- Formed: 1 October 2016; 9 years ago
- Preceding agencies: Infocomm Development Authority (IDA); Media Development Authority (MDA)
- Jurisdiction: Government of Singapore
- Headquarters: 10 Pasir Panjang Road, #03-01, Mapletree Business City, Singapore 117438
- Annual budget: S$34 million (2011)
- Agency executives: Russell Tham, Chairman; Ng Cher Pong, CEO
- Parent agency: Ministry of Digital Development and Information
- Website: www.imda.gov.sg

The Infocomm Media Development Authority (IMDA) is a statutory board under the Singapore Ministry of Digital Development and Information (MDDI).

== History ==
The Telecommunication Authority of Singapore (TAS) was the statutory board that acted as the national regulator and promoter of the telecommunication and postal industries in Singapore. Prior to 1992, the TAS also managed postal and telecommunications services until Singtel and Singapore Post were split off from the board as corporatised entities.

In 1999, the Infocomm Development Authority (IDA) was formed in 1999 from the merger of the TAS and National Computer Board (NCB).

Following the passing of the Info-communications Media Development Authority Bill in Parliament on 16 August 2016, the IDA and the Media Development Authority (MDA) were restructured and merged into the IMDA with effect from 30 September that year.

== Digital Content and Capability Development programme ==
In June 2026, IMDA launched the four-year Digital Content and Capability Development programme, a S$48 million fund for accredited Singapore media firms to produce Singapore-centric content and experiment with formats and technologies such as short-form episodic content and AI-assisted production workflows.

== Key functions ==
IMDA provides numerous programmes, policies and grants that cater to industries and communities. IMDA also protects consumers' privacy through the Personal Data Protection Commission (PDPC). Since 2019, IMDA administrates the Protection from Online Falsehoods and Manipulation Act 2019 through the dedicated POFMA Office.

In July 2026, IMDA introduced voluntary transparency guidelines for public-facing generative AI chatbots. The guidelines encourage chatbot deployers to provide an information card, either through a dedicated webpage or disclosure document, summarising the chatbot's capabilities and limitations, reliability and safety, handling of user data, and procedures for raising concerns or reporting problems. IMDA recommended that the information be written in plain language and kept accessible and up to date.

== Classifications ==
There are classification systems for the following types of media: films, TV programs, video games, and arts entertainment (e.g., theatrical productions). Films and TV programs both use the same rating system. Free-to-air TV content must also adhere to additional restrictions, as outlined in Section 5 of the Content Code.

Badge	Rating	Notes
	General (G)	Suitable for persons of all ages.
	Parental Guidance (PG)	Suitable for persons of all ages, but parental guidance is recommended for younger viewers. This rating is merely an advisory, and is not legally enforced - however, film distributors and TV providers must prominently display this rating in marketing and/or at the start of the program.
	Parental Guidance for Children Under 13 (PG13)	Parental guidance is advised for those under the age of 13 years old. This is also an advisory rating, similar to PG. Content that carries this rating or higher must also provide consumer advice as to why it received this rating, e.g. 'Violence', 'Language', or 'Horror'. Free-to-air (FTA) TV networks may only show content at this rating or lower, and can only air PG13 content between 10PM and 6AM. Advertisements for films with this rating cannot be shown where a child may inadvertently be exposed to them (e.g. on video walls).
	No Children Under 16 (NC16)	Restricted to persons aged 16 or above. This is a legally enforced rating - patrons who watch a film with this rating or higher must present photo identification. Pay TV and video-on-demand (VOD) operators must adhere to several restrictions in order to ensure that a child is not inadvertently exposed to rated content. They are required to offer a 'parental lock' feature, which restricts NC16 and M18 content with a PIN code. Pay TV operators must also ensure that promotional material for rated content is "edited and scheduled appropriately."
	Mature 18 (M18)	Restricted to persons aged 18 or above. Similar to NC16, photo identification is required when watching a rated film in a cinema. Pay TV operators are only allowed to air content with this rating or lower. In addition, pay TV operators can air M18-classified content only from the watershed that PG13 classified content is allowed to be aired on free-to-air TV.
	Restricted 21 (R21)	Restricted to persons aged 21 or above. This is the highest rating in the current classification system - like NC16 and M18, this is also legally enforced. Pay TV operators are not allowed to air content with this rating, and VOD operators must offer a separate PIN lock for R21 content as a default. Advertisements for R21-rated content can only appear in venues licensed for R21 films, and/or at the start of another R21-rated movie.
	Refused Classification	Denotes content that was not approved for release in Singapore under any classification. This is not an official rating under the current system, but was formerly used by the MDA to denote films that were refused classification, and it is now used as semi-official descriptor today. Many films that the IMDA refused to classify were restricted because of concerns that they might "undermine the public order". For example, the film To Singapore, With Love, which documented former political dissidents in Singapore, was refused classification, as the MDA believed it was one-sided and "undermined national security".

Following a later-lifted ban of the video game Mass Effect in November 2007 for containing a same-sex romance scene, IMDA announced that a new classification system for games will be put in place early 2008. Since April 2008, video games that are sold in Singapore are required to undergo classification.

As of 2022, there are 2 ratings for video games: Mature 18 and Advisory 16. Games without contentious content fall within the “General” category, and they do not require Singapore-specific rating labels. Games only need to be classified if they are physically sold in Singapore. However, some digital storefronts like Steam may display the classification rating to local users if one is available.

Rating	Full Badge	Icon	Notes
Advisory 16(ADV16)			Suitable for individuals who are at least 16 years old. Unlike the NC16 rating, this is an advisory rating, and is not legally enforced.
Mature 18(M18)	No official badge after July 2021		Restricted to individuals who are at least 18 years old. This is legally enforced, and customers who attempt to purchase these games must present photo identification. Prior to July 2021, the distributor needed to purchase official labels from IMDA - today, distributors can simply self-print the labels.

== See also ==
- Government Technology Agency (GovTech)
- Cyber Security Agency
